= 2012 Albanian presidential election =

Election of Bujar Nishani

- 30 May - 11 June 2012
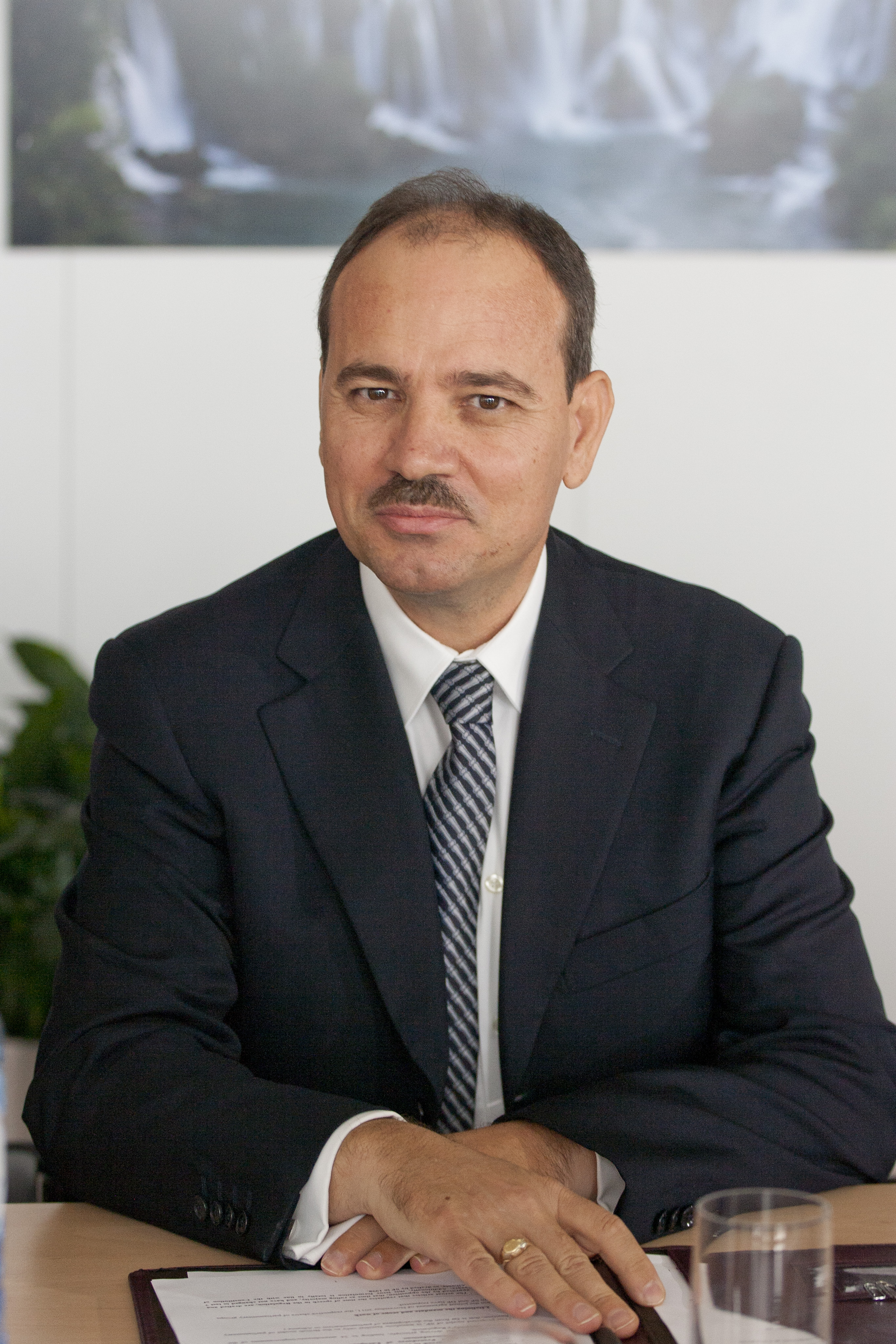
Nominee	Bujar Nishani
Party	PD
Popular vote	73 of 140 MPs
Percentage	52.14%
President before election
Bamir Topi
PD
Elected President
Bujar Nishani
PD

Indirect presidential elections were held in Albania on 30 May, 4, 8 and 11 June 2012, the seventh such elections since the collapse of the communist regime in 1991. The first through third rounds of voting were inconclusive. The fourth round resulted in the incumbent party's member Bujar Nishani being elected as President.

The President of Albania is elected through a secret vote and without debate by the Parliament of Albania by a majority of three-fifths majority of all its members. The Constitution of Albania sets a limit to a maximum of two terms in office. When this majority is not reached in the first round of voting, a second round takes place within seven days. If such a majority is still not reached, a third round must take place within a further period of seven days. If even in the first three rounds no candidate has attained the necessary majority, a further two rounds must be held within seven days, with the majority needed to win being reduce to an absolute majority or 50% +1 vote of the total Members of the Parliament. If after five rounds of voting no candidate has attained the necessary majority outlined for each round of voting in the Parliament, the Parliament will be dissolved and a general election must occur within 60 days.

== Candidates ==
While the two major parties (the ruling Democratic Party and the oppositional Socialist Party) were arguing about their candidates for the new president, some smaller parties already proposed their candidates. The Albanian Christian Democratic Movement has formally announced the current Speaker of Parliament Jozefina Topalli as their presidential nominee, this was a surprising choice as Topalli has widely been seen and speculated upon by the media as the potential Democratic Party candidate for the post.

Other smaller parties have also presented their candidates. The Democratic Alliance Party has officially proposed the name of its current leader Neritan Ceka as the party's nominee for the presidential race. For the representative of this party Ceka has all the chances to be chosen as a compromise candidate and win the support of all the parties.

Aleko Gjergjo and Hajredin Fratari are the two candidates that have been proposed by the Democratic National Front Party.

A name that has been speculated upon by the media to be a strong contender in the presidential race is that of former Prime Minister and presidential candidate Fatos Nano. He received only 3 votes in the previous presidential election held in 2007 because most members of the opposition coalition led by the Socialist Party did not support him, however, and chose to boycott this Presidential Election.

Unity for Human Rights Party have officially stated its support for Nano's nomination.

The full name list proposed by the majority Berisha-Meta Cabinet:

- Ardian Fullani, Governor of the Bank of Albania
- Artur Kuko, Ambassador in NATO
- Dashnor Dervishi, Ambassador in Greece
- Ferit Hoxha, Ambassador at the UN
- Ledi Bianku, Member of the Strasbourg Court
- Kristaq Traja, Former Member of the Strasbourg Court
- Mimoza Halimi, Ambassador in Belgium
- Xhezair Zaganjori, member of the Constitutional Court
- Amik Kasoruho, intellectual and former prisoner during the communist regime

The full name list individually proposed by the deputies of Socialist Party:

- Pandeli Majko, former Prime Minister
- Fatos Nano, former Prime Minister
- Paskal Milo, Leader of the Social Democracy Party of Albania

== Election ==
=== First round ===
The Socialist Party rejected Zaganjori, as the first round of voting on 30 May failed without a vote. It accused the Democratic Party of not consulting them over the move to elect Zaganjori. Parliamentary speaker Jozefina Topalli said that "I urge all political parties to pursue a spirit of acceptance, and then the solution will come in the second or third round."

=== Second round ===
The Democratic Party insisted on naming Zaganjori, with Prime Minister Sali Berisha saying that "we've done our part, we gave up our initial positions, renouncing a political candidature and take a step towards the opposition in order to reach a mutual agreement. Let's hope the opposition do their part now." The Socialist Party countered in saying that Zaganjori's nomination was put forward unilaterally and asked for more negotiations to reach a compromise. The Leader of the Opposition Edi Rama said that "our objective is to give the country a head of state who receives support both from the government and the opposition. We aren't laying out any conditions. The government must make it possible for us to also make a contribution."

=== Third round ===
On 8 June, no vote was taken as there was no candidate following the Socialist Party's rejection of Zaganjori. Zaganjori then withdrew his candidacy, stating that he wanted to be elected as a consensus candidate and as the opposition did not trust him he did not want to be elected with the governing party's votes alone.

=== Fourth round ===
On 10 June, the day before the vote, a meeting between the leaders of the Socialist Party, the Democratic Party, the Socialist Movement for Integration and Justice for Integration and Unity was inconclusive, the proposed candidates for the first list were: Arben Imami (Minister of Defense), Bujar Nishani (Minister of Interior), Artan Hoxha (columnist), Petraq Milo (prime minister's adviser). A second non-political list included: Edmond Islamaj (member of Supreme Court of Albania), Vitore Tusha also member of Supreme Court, Ledio Bianku. The Socialist Movement for Integration's Ilir Meta said the consensus candidate would be Hoxha, although the opposition was rumoured to have named Pandeli Majko as their candidate

On the day of the vote, Hoxha withdrew his candidacy saying:

Until yesterday night I hoped that the presidential process would have the minimal spirit of understanding and consensus, and this morning, after receiving hundreds of congratulatory messages, with some of them coming from Socialist Party members, I have continued to hope that the presidential process still promised consensus. But seeing the aggressive stances of Socialist exponents and their media, including slander and blackmail, I reached the conclusion that the presidential process cannot have the minimum of civilization, and due to the political interests, the process will not be allowed to contribute the civil factors. I have followed the presidential process very closely and have commented for a reasonable and consensual reason. I thought to contribute in the last session for the same goal, but based on what I declared above, I cannot be part of this process which apparently warns a storm.

The Democratic Party's parliamentary leader, Astrit Patozi, said that Nishani would be the candidate at a voting session at 17:00. The Socialist Party's Edi Rama also said that Fatos Nano would not be the party's candidate: "If Nano’s candidacy would be consensual, we would not break the consensus, but he cannot be our candidate, because we cannot break our principles and ruin Albania’s opportunity for the EU candidate status." He also said the Socialist Party would never support Hoxha as "it is unacceptable for a minister to become president, especially in a time of crisis like the one we’re in." Nano reacted to the Socialist Party's decision in saying that "this is the moment when the party leaders should think beyond their close political accounts that have deteriorated Albania, and show their full responsibility for the love of the country, with its values and merits that a European country deserves." He also said that he proposed himself as a consensus candidate to bring about a solution and preface a possible Socialist Party win in the next parliamentary election, as well as a win for all Albanians.

The vice leader of the Socialist Movement for Integration, Petrit Vasili, would support an agreement with the Democratic Party to choose a president. The head of the United for Humans Right party, Vangjel Dule, said that: "The majority still showed that they cannot elect the President, even with simple majority. I appeal the opposition and Edi Rama, since we have an incapable majority, to not allow the opposition to avoid the political battle, but offer its alternative through Fatos Nano." The Party for Justice, Integration and Unity's Shpetim Idrizi also said that the Socialist Party should support Nano’s candidacy. Gazmend Oketa, one of the founders of the New Democratic Spirit, added to calls for a consensus candidate president. "Our country needs consensus, and our country seems on the brink of early elections."

The final vote came despite calls from the Western world for a consensus candidate. On 11 June, 76 voted were cast. However, two MPs filed a white vote. Nishani was elected with 73 votes. He then shook hands with MPs but did not make a speech.

European Union's ambassador to Albania, Ettore Sequi, issued a statement that read: "The role of the president in anchoring Albania's state institutions in independence and in helping the country unite its efforts will be of crucial importance for Albania to successfully address the challenges it faces on its path towards the European Union."

== See also ==
- Politics of Albania
