= 2007 electoral calendar =

National and federal elections held in 2007

This electoral calendar 2007 lists the national/federal direct elections held in 2007 in the de jure and de facto sovereign states and their dependent territories. Referendums are included, although they are not elections. By-elections are not included.

== January ==
- 19 January: Democratic Republic of the Congo, Senate
- 21 January: Serbia, National Assembly
- 21 January: Mauritania, Senate (1st Round)
- 25 January: Gambia, Parliament
- 27 January: Democratic Republic of the Congo, Governors (1st Round)

== February ==
- 4 February: Mauritania, Senate (2nd Round)
- 9 February: Turks and Caicos Islands, Parliament
- 11 February: Turkmenistan, President
- 11 February: Portugal, Referendum on abortion
- 15 February: Democratic Republic of the Congo, Governors (2nd Round)
- 17 February: Lesotho, National Assembly
- 25 February: Senegal, President

== March ==
- 4 March: Estonia, Parliament
- 4 March: Abkhazia, Parliament (1st Round)
- 6 March: Micronesia, Parliament
- 11 March: Mauritania, President (1st Round)
- 18 March: Abkhazia, Parliament (2nd Round)
- 18 March: Finland, Parliament
- 25 March: Hong Kong, Chief Executive
- 25 March: Mauritania, President (2nd Round)
- 26 March: Egypt, Constitutional referendum
- 31 March: Benin, National Assembly

== April ==
- 1 April: Wallis and Futuna, Territorial Assembly
- 4 April: Madagascar, Constitutional referendum
- 9 April: East Timor, President (1st Round)
- 15 April: Ecuador, Referendum on Constituent Assembly
- 21 April: Nigeria, President and Parliament
- 22 April: France, President (1st Round)
- 22 April: Syria, Parliament
- 27 April: Turkey, President (1st Round)
- 29 April: Mali, President

== May ==
- 2 May: Bahamas, Parliament
- 6 May: Turkey, President (2nd Round)
- 6 May: France, President (2nd round)
- 6 May: Burkina Faso, National Assembly
- 9 May: East Timor, President (2nd round)
- 10 – 12 May: Seychelles, Parliament
- 11 May: Federated States of Micronesia, President
- 12 May: Armenia, Parliament
- 12 May: Iceland, Parliament
- 14 May: Philippines, Senate (one half Senators elected in 2001), House of Representatives and Local
- 17 May: Algeria, Parliament
- 19 May: Romania, Referendum to impeach the president
- 20 May: Vietnam, Parliament
- 20 May: Bulgaria, European Union Parliament
- 24 May: Ireland, Parliament
- 27 May: Syria, President
- 31 May: Latvia, President

== June ==
- 3 June: Senegal, Parliament
- 10 June: Belgium, Parliament
- 10 June: France, Legislature (1st Round)
- 11 June: Egypt, Shura Council
- 12 June: U.S. Virgin Islands, Constitutional Convention
- 13 June: Israel, President
- 16 June: Samoa, President
- 17 June: France, Legislature (2nd Round)
- 20 June: Albania, President (1st Round)
- 24 June: Republic of the Congo, Parliament (1st round)
- 27 June: Albania, President (2nd Round)
- 30 June: East Timor, Parliament
- 30 June – 10 July: Papua New Guinea, Parliament

== July ==
- 1 July: Mali, Parliament (1st round)
- 1 July: Saint Barthelemy, Territorial Council
- 1 July: Saint Martin, Territorial Council (1st Round)
- 7 July: Latvia, Referendum on security laws
- 8 July: Saint Martin, Territorial Council (1st Round)
- 8 July: Albania, President (3rd Round)
- 11 July: Albania, President (3rd Round)
- 14 July: Albania, President (4th Round)
- 19 July: India, President
- 19 July: Nagorno-Karabakh, President
- 20 July: Albania, President (5th Round)
- 22 July: Cameroon, Parliament
- 22 July: Turkey, Parliament
- 22 July: Mali, Parliament (2nd round)
- 24 July: Vietnam, President
- 29 July: Japan, House of Councillors

== August ==
- 5 August: Republic of the Congo, Parliament (2nd round)
- 11 August: Sierra Leone, President and Parliament
- 18 August: Kazakhstan, Parliament
- 18 August: Maldives, Constitutional referendum
- 19 August: Thailand, Referendum on the new constitution
- 20 August: British Virgin Islands, Legislature
- 20 August: Turkey, President (3rd Round)
- 22 August: Kiribati, Parliament (1st Round)
- 24 August: Turkey, President (4th Round)
- 25 August: Nauru, Parliament
- 28 August: Nauru, President
- 28 August: Turkey, President (5th Round)
- 30 August: Kiribati, Parliament (2nd Round)

== September ==
- 3 September: Jamaica, Parliament
- 7 September: Morocco, Parliament
- 9 September: Guatemala, President (1st Round) and Parliament
- 16 September: Greece, Parliament
- 23 September: Madagascar, Parliament
- 30 September: Ecuador, Constituent Assembly
- 30 September: Ukraine, Parliament

== October ==
- 6 October: Pakistan, President
- 7 October: Costa Rica, Referendum on DR-CAFTA
- 9 October: Ethiopia, President
- 11 October: Gibraltar, Parliament
- 14 October: Togo, Parliament
- 17 October: Kiribati, President
- 20 October: Tokelau, Referendum on self-determination (1st Round)
- 21 October: Switzerland, Federal
- 21 October: Åland, Legislative
- 21 October: Slovenia, President (1st Round)
- 21 October: Turkey, Constitutional referendum
- 21 October: Poland, Parliament
- 21 October: Kyrgyzstan, Constitutional referendum
- 22 – 24 October: Tokelau, Referendum on self-determination (2nd Round)
- 27 October: Oman, Assembly
- 28 October: Argentina, President and Parliament
- 29 October: Philippines, Local

== November ==
- 3 November: Northern Mariana Islands, Legislature
- 4 November: Guatemala, President (2nd round)
- 5 November: Trinidad and Tobago, Parliament
- 11 November: Slovenia, President (2nd round)
- 13 November: Denmark, Parliament
- 17 November: Kosovo, Parliament
- 19 November: Marshall Islands, Legislature
- 20 November: Jordan, Parliament
- 24 November: Australia, Parliament
- 25 November: Croatia, Parliament
- 25 November: Romania, European Union Parliament
- 25 November: Romania, Voting system referendum

== December ==
- 2 December: Russia, Legislative
- 2 December: Venezuela, Referendum on constitutional changes
- 9 December: Turkmenistan, People's Council
- 9 December: Pitcairn Islands, General
- 12 December: Switzerland, Federal Council (indirect)
- 16 December: Kyrgyzstan, Parliament
- 18 December: Bermuda, Parliament
- 19 December: South Korea, President
- 23 December: Thailand, Parliament
- 23 December: Uzbekistan, President
- 27 December: Kenya, President and Parliament
- 31 December: Bhutan, National Council

== See also ==
- Canadian electoral calendar, 2007
