= First Lady of Albania =

- Zonja e Parë e Shqipërisë
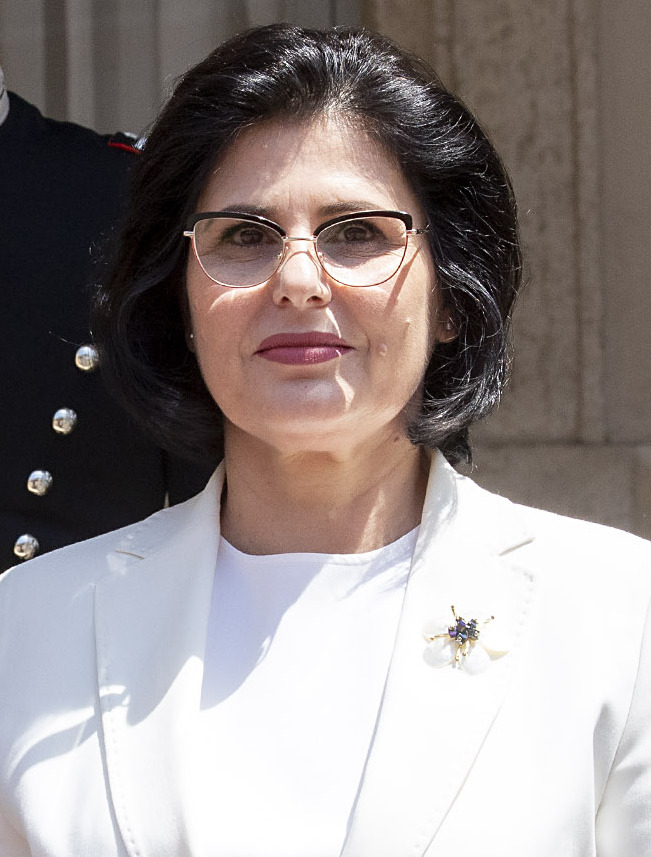
- Incumbent; Armanda Begaj since 24 July 2022
- Residence: Presidential Palace of Tirana
- Inaugural holder: Liri Berisha (de facto)
- Formation: 30 April 1991
- Website: First Lady of Albania

The first lady of Albania (Albanian: Zonja e Parë) is the unofficial title of the wife or designee of the sitting President of Albania. The current first lady is Armanda Ymeri, wife of President Bajram Begaj, who has held the role since July 2022.

== Role of the first lady ==
The first lady is not an elected position, carries no official duties, and brings no salary. Nonetheless, she participates in humanitarian and charitable work in conjunction with the office of the presidency. Albanian first ladies have taken an active role in campaigning for the president with whom they are associated. She accompanies the President in state and official protocol visits abroad.

== First ladies of Albania (1925–1928, 1945–1991 and 1991–present) ==
No.	Birthname	Term begins	Term ends	President of Albania
Albanian Republic (1925–1928)
1st	Geraldine Apponyi (Note: Geraldine Apponyi married Ahmet Zogu a decade later.)	1 February 1925	1 September 1928	Ahmet Zogu
People's Socialist Republic of Albania (1946–1991)
2nd	Nexhmije Hoxha (Note: As the spouse of the First Secretary of the Party of Labour of Albania)	23 October 1944	11 April 1985	Enver Hoxha
Republic of Albania (1991–present)
3rd	Semiramis Xhuvani (Note: Semiramis Xhuvani, the daughter of prominent scholar Aleksandër Xhuvani died before her husband took office of the presidency.)	30 April 1991	3 April 1992	Ramiz Alia
4th	Lirie Ramaj	9 April 1992	24 July 1997	Sali Berisha
5th	Lidra Karagjozi	24 July 1997	24 July 2002	Rexhep Meidani
6th	Milica Niça (Note: Milica Niça was deceased when Alfred Moisiu became President of the Republic, his youngest daughter Mirela Moisiu carried the First Lady duties.)	24 July 2002	24 July 2007	Alfred Moisiu
7th	Teuta Mema	24 July 2007	24 July 2012	Bamir Topi
8th	Odeta Kosova	24 July 2012	24 July 2017	Bujar Nishani
9th	Monika Kryemadhi (Note: Monika Kryemadhi, as a Member of Parliament and the leader of the second largest opposition party LSI, refused to take on the duties of the First Lady therefore the couple's eldest child and daughter Bora Meta carried on as First Lady.)	24 July 2017	24 July 2022	Ilir Meta
10th	Armanda Ymeri	24 July 2022	Incumbent	Bajram Begaj
