= Armanda Begaj =

First Lady of Albania since 2022

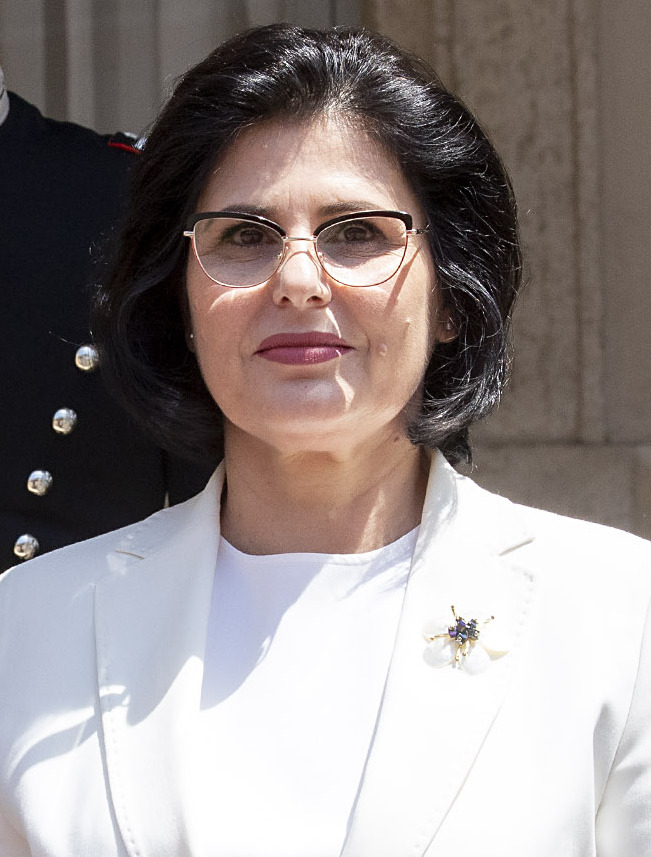
- Begaj in May 2023

First Lady of Albania
- Current
- Assumed role 24 July 2022
- President: Bajram Begaj
- Preceded by: Monika Kryemadhi

Personal details
- Born: Armanda Ymeri; 12 July 1968 (age 58) Tirana, PSR Albania
- Spouse: Bajram Begaj (m. 1992)
- Children: 2
- Education: University of Tirana

Armanda Begaj (née Ymeri; born 12 July 1968) is an Albanian IT specialist and former teacher, who has been the First Lady of Albania since July 2022 as the wife of President of Albania Bajram Begaj.

== Early life and education ==
Begaj was born Armanda Ymeri on July 12, 1968 in Tirana.

In 1990, Begaj got a Bachelor's degree in Mathematics from the Faculty of Natural Sciences of the University of Tirana. In 2011, she got a Bachelor's degree in Business Administration from the Faculty of Economics of the university.

== Career ==
From 1990 to 2002, Begaj worked as a mathematics teacher. From 2002 to 2021, she was an IT specialist with the State Supreme Audit. Since 2021, Begaj has been an IT specialist with the Financial Supervision Authority.

In the 2022 Albanian presidential election, Begaj's husband Bajram Begaj was elected President of Albania on June 3, 2022, causing Begaj to become First Lady of Albania.

== Personal life ==
Begaj has been married to Bajram Begaj since 1992. The couple has two sons who study medicine.
