= Begaj (surname) =

Begaj is a surname. Notable people with the surname include:

- Armanda Begaj, First Lady of Albania since 2022
- Bajram Begaj, President of Albania since 2022
- Halim Begaj, Albanian footballer
- Romela Begaj (born 1986), Albanian weightlifter
