= 2022 Albanian presidential election =

Election of Bajram Begaj

- 16 May – 4 June 2022

20 of 140 votes needed to be nominated 84 of 140 votes needed to win
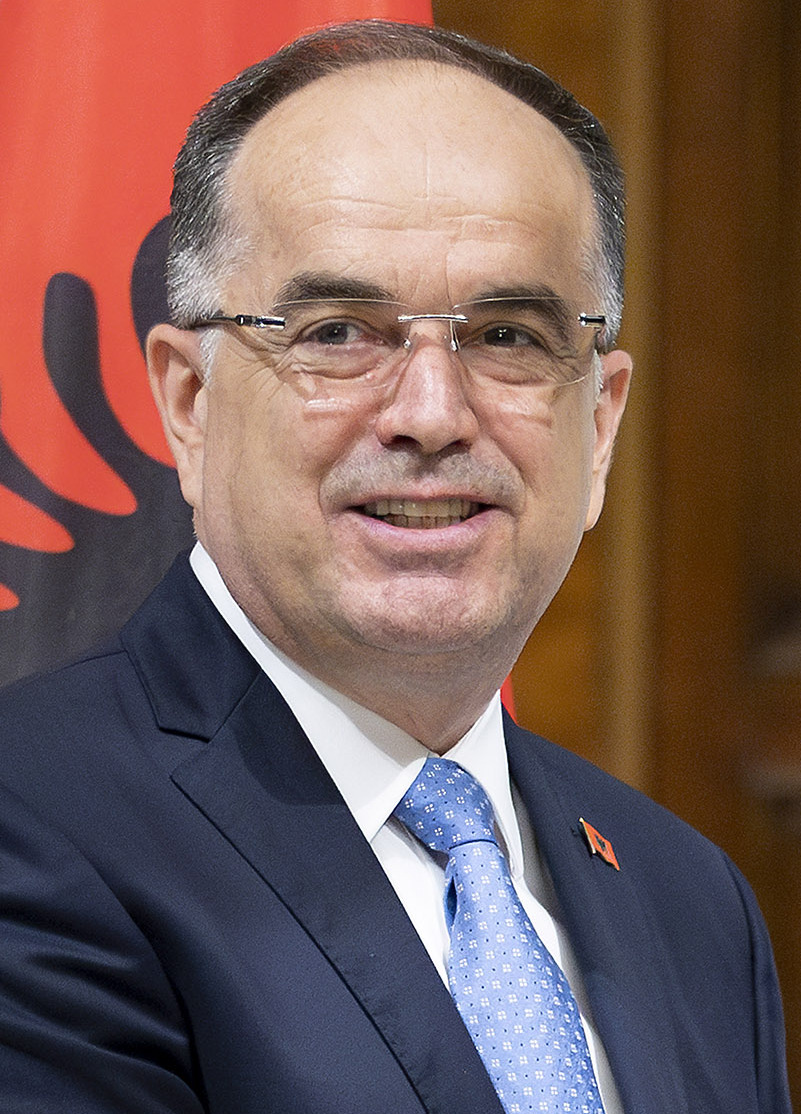
Candidate	Bajram Begaj
Electoral vote	78
Percentage	55.7%
President before election
Ilir Meta
Elected President
Bajram Begaj

The 2022 Albanian presidential election marked the ninth presidential election held in Albania, taking place from 10 May to 4 June 2022. The election process commenced with the nomination of candidates by the parliament of Albania, necessitating a total of four rounds of voting. The initial three rounds of voting, held on 16, 23, and 30 May, did not result in the election of a president due to an insufficient number of candidates, largely attributed to the internal leadership crisis of the Democratic Party (PD) and the disagreements among the governing parties. On 3 June, the Socialist Party (PS) nominated Bajram Begaj, who was subsequently elected in the fourth round on 4 June.

The election of the president of Albania is regulated by the constitution, which delineates specific criteria for candidacy that include being Albanian citizens by birth, have resided in Albania for a minimum of ten years, be at least 40 years of age, and refrain from holding any political party affiliation. The electoral process is initiated by parliament, which is responsible for scheduling elections at least 30 days prior to the expiration of the incumbent term of the president. The election is conducted through a secret ballot, requiring a three-fifths majority; should this majority not be attained after multiple voting rounds, the parliament may be dissolved, requiring subsequent elections. Upon election, the president serves a term of five years, with the possibility of re-election for one additional consecutive term.

Bajram Begaj was inaugurated as the president of Albania on 24 July 2022 in Tirana, beginning his five-year term after taking the oath in the parliament. In his inaugural address, he articulated key priorities including national unity, security, European Union (EU) integration, and Albania's role in the international community. Begaj committed to upholding the constitution while promoting the rights and prosperity of the Albanian people. His inauguration garnered congratulations from various international dignitaries, including leaders from China, Kosovo, Russia and Saudi Arabia, underscoring the significance of Albania's diplomatic relations and its commitment to international integration.

== Background ==
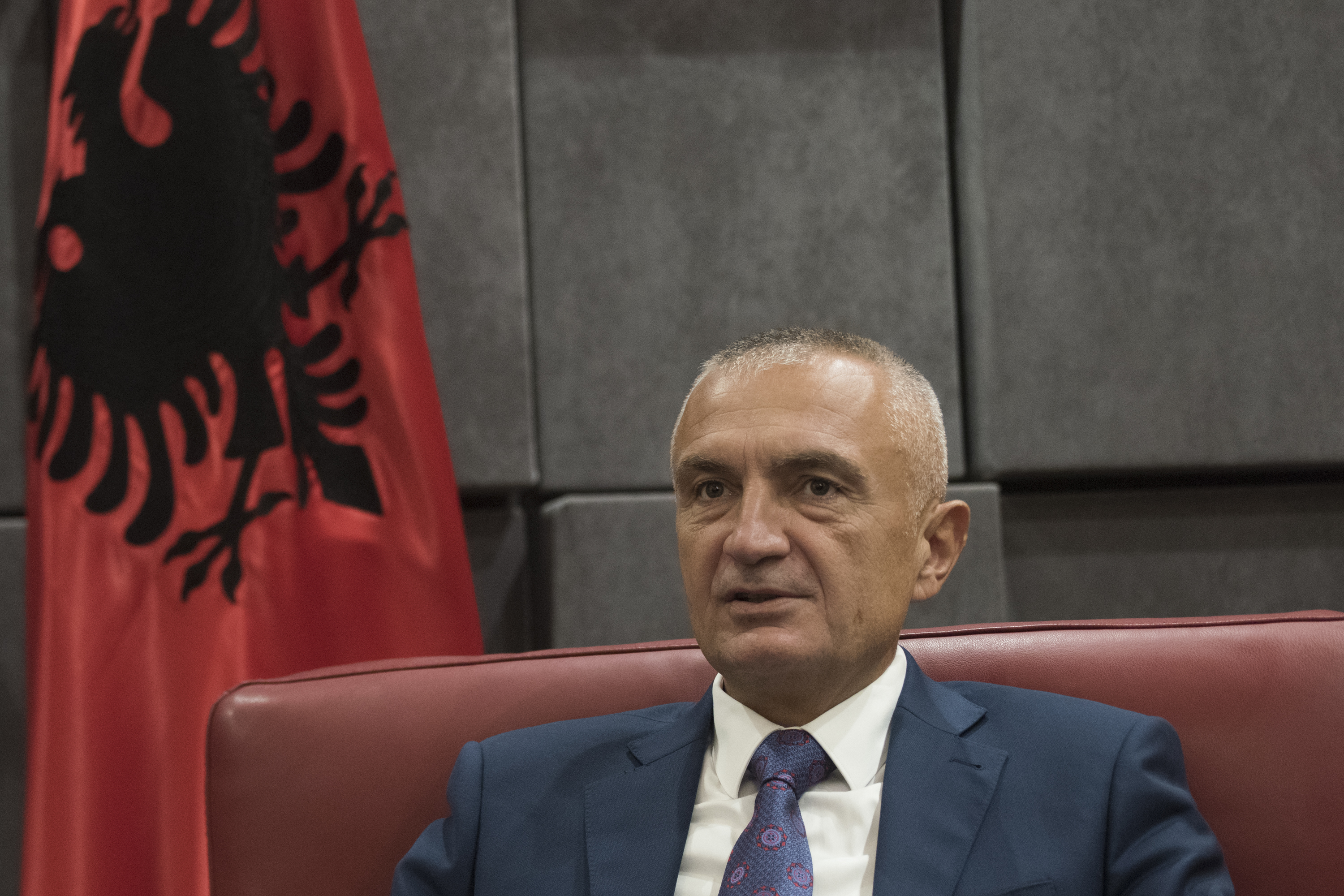
President Ilir Meta held the office of the president of Albania from 24 July 2017 to 24 July 2022.

The previous presidential election was held in 2017 during a period of significant political crisis, characterised by the 2017 opposition protests and the subsequent 2019–2021 political crisis. The political landscape was divided among the Democratic Party (PD), the Socialist Movement for Integration (LSI) and the Socialist Party (PS). Ilir Meta, who represented the LSI before his resignation, was elected as the president of Albania on 24 July 2017. Meta's presidency was marked by notable political controversy, most prominently his impeachment by the parliament in June 2021. This decision was later annulled by the constitutional court of Albania, which ruled that the evidence against him did not constitute a grave violation of the constitution.

== Regulations ==
The election of the president of Albania is regulated by the constitution of Albania, particularly articulated in the fourth part, comprising articles 86 to 94. In order to be eligible for candidacy, individuals must fulfill several criteria as delineated in the constitution: they must be Albanian citizens by birth, have resided in Albania for no less than the past 10 years, be at least 40 years of age, and possess the right to vote. Furthermore, the constitution mandates that the president shall not occupy any other public office, be affiliated with any political party, or engage in private business activities. The electoral process commences with the parliament of Albania, which is responsible for scheduling elections at least 30 days prior to the expiration of the incumbent term of the president. Candidates are nominated through a formal process in which a group of at least 20 members of the total 140 members of the parliament may propose an individual for the presidency.

The election of the president is conducted by the parliament through a secret ballot without debate, requiring a candidate to secure a majority of three-fifths of all members of the parliament. If this majority is not achieved in the first ballot, a second ballot is held within seven days, followed by a third ballot if necessary. If no candidate receives the required majority after the third ballot, a fourth ballot occurs within seven days, limited to the two candidates with the highest votes from the previous round. If neither candidate secures the necessary majority in the fourth ballot, a fifth ballot is conducted. If, after the fifth ballot, neither candidate achieves the required majority, the parliament is dissolved, necessitating subsequent parliamentary elections within 60 days. The successive elected parliament is then responsible for electing the president according to the procedures regulated in the constitution. Further, if the parliament fails to elect a president, it correspondingly will be dissolved, requiring another round of general elections within the same period.

Upon election, the president begins their duties after taking an oath before the parliament, affirming their commitment to uphold the constitution and laws of Albania, respect the rights and freedoms of citizens, protect the independence of the nation, and serve the general interest and progress of the Albanians. The term of office for the president is defined at five years, with the possibility of re-election for a maximum of two consecutive terms. In the event that a president resigns before the end of their term, they are prohibited from being a candidate in the subsequent presidential election. When the president is temporarily unable to exercise their functions or if the office becomes vacant, the speaker of the parliament of Albania assumes the responsibilities of the president. If the president is unable to fulfill their duties for more than 60 days, the parliament must decide, by a two-thirds majority, whether to refer the issue to the constitutional court. The court determines the incapacity of the president, and if incapacity is confirmed, the election of a successive president must commence within 10 days of such determination.

== Candidates and election ==
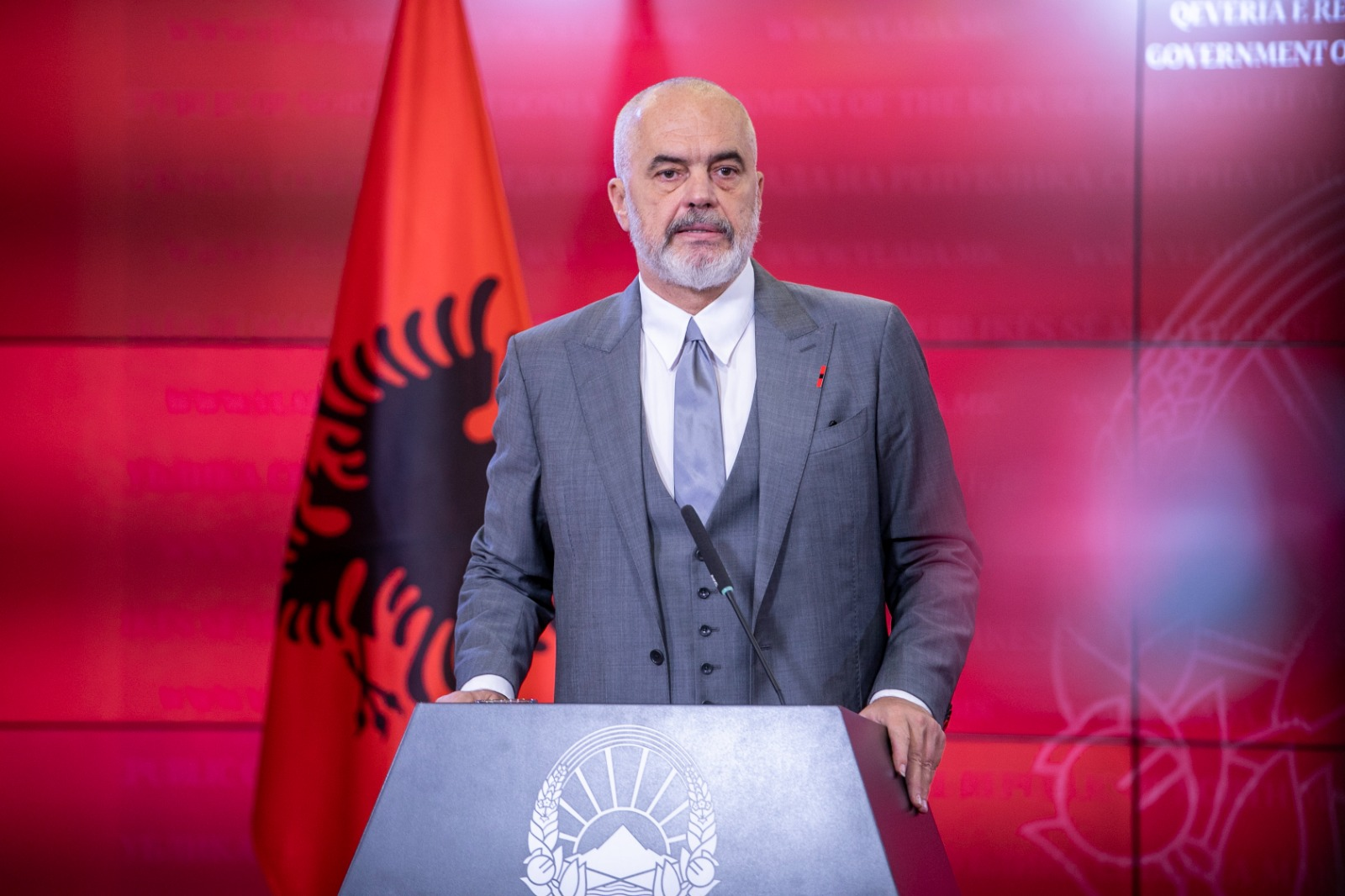
Prime Minister Edi Rama announced Bajram Begaj as the candidate for the presidency on 3 June 2022.

On 10 May 2022, the parliament initiated the official proceedings for the selection of the president, with its speaker convening the chairs of parliamentary parties to define a timeline for the first round of presidential voting. Subsequently, Taulant Balla of the Socialist Party (PS) engaged in discussions with party leaders to achieve consensus on the electoral process. Despite these negotiations between the governing PS and the opposition, led by the Democratic Party (PD), significant challenges emerged in reaching an agreement on a suitable candidate. The PD's ongoing internal leadership crisis hindered its ability to propose a contender. Consequently, on May 16, the first round of voting culminated in a failure to elect a successor, as no candidates were presented from the parties. On 20 May, prior to the second round of presidential voting, a consensus was reached between the parties that designated the PS with the exclusive authority to propose candidates for the second and third rounds of voting, contingent upon a free vote by the deputies. Conversely, the PD would assume the responsibility for presenting candidates in the fourth round, should the preceding rounds fail to yield a successful election. Nonetheless, both the second round on 23 May and the third round on 30 May failed to yield a candidate due to a lack of proposals. As discussions persisted, the prime minister Edi Rama asserted that, in the absence of a consensus, the PS would proceed with their own candidate selection.

On 31 May, the parliament convened to schedule the fourth round of presidential voting for 4 June, adjacent to the unsuccessful completion of the previous three rounds on 16, 23 and 30 May, which concluded without the presentation of official candidates. On 3 June, one day prior to the scheduled voting, the PS announced the nomination of Bajram Begaj, who had resigned as Chief of the General Staff of the Armed Forces of Albania before the parliamentary session, as its candidate for the presidency. In a statement issued after a leadership meeting, Rama confirmed the party's endorsement of Begaj, underscoring the necessity for decisive leadership at this critical juncture. Ultimately, Begaj was elected as the successive president, receiving 78 votes in favor, which surpassed the requisite 71 votes. Meanwhile, four votes were cast against him, and one member abstained, resulting in a total of 83 voters present in the parliament. Notably, the governing opposition, the PD, did not participate in the process.

Results of the 2022 Albanian presidential election
Candidate	Party (Note: In accordance with Article 89 of the Albanian constitution, which was enacted in 1998, the president is prohibited from maintaining affiliation with any political party. Consequently, the individual elected to the presidency is required to renounce their party affiliations for the duration of their presidential term.)	First round		Second round		Third round		Fourth round	
Candidate	Party	Votes	%	Votes	%	Votes	%	Votes	%
Bajram Begaj	Independent	No candidates						78	95.12
Against		No candidates						4	4.88
Required majority		84 votes						71 votes	
Valid votes		—						82	98.8
Abstentions		—						1	1.2
Total								83	100
Absents		—						57	40.71
Registered voters		—						140	59.29

== Aftermath ==
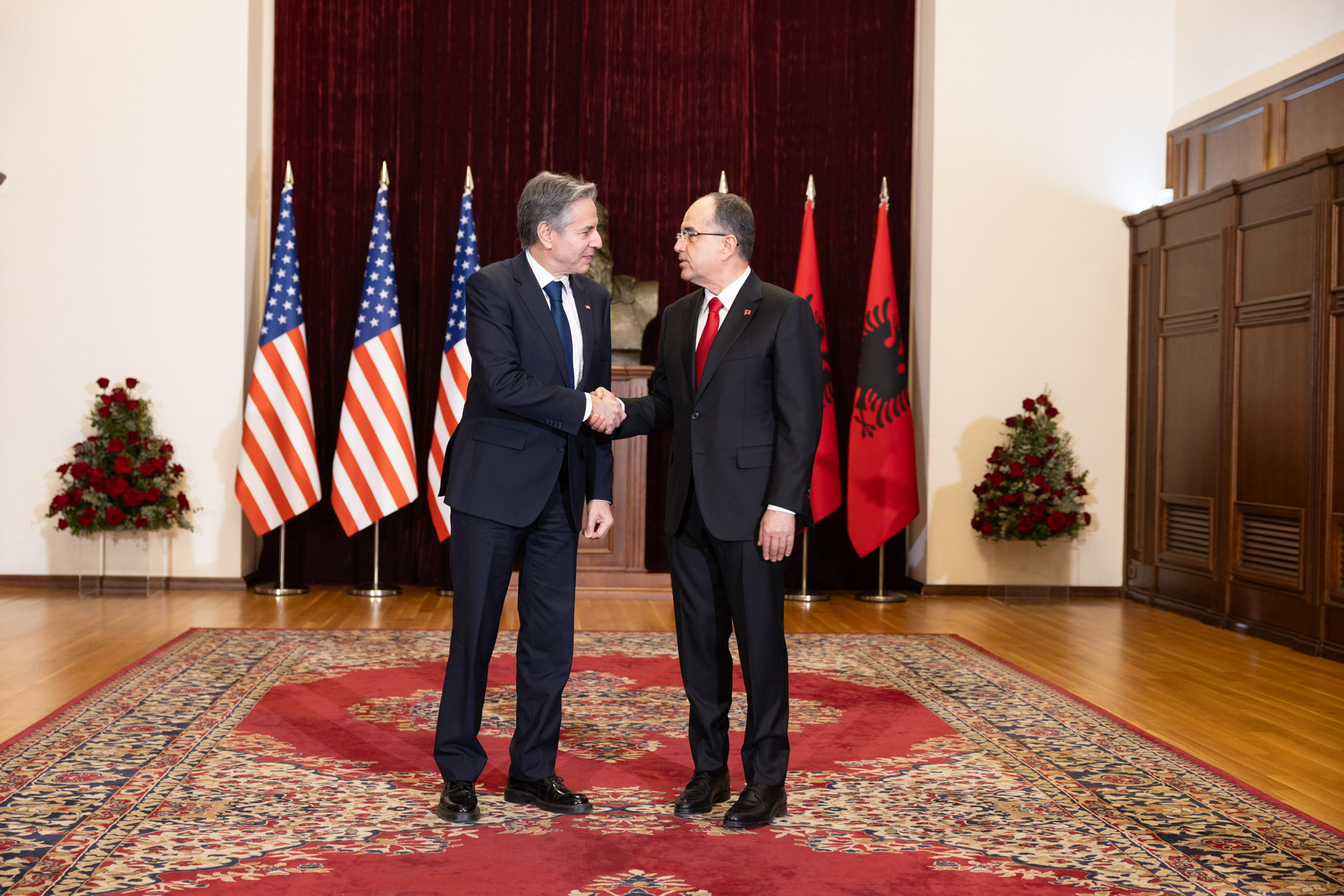
President Bajram Begaj and US Secretary Antony Blinken engaged in a diplomatic meeting at the Presidenca in Tirana, Albania, in February 2024.

On 24 July, Bajram Begaj was inaugurated as president of Albania, commencing his five-year term in office. The inauguration occurred in the parliament of Albania, where Begaj took the oath of office, affirming his commitment to uphold the constitution of nation. In his inaugural address, he delineated his principal priorities, emphasising the importance of unity, security, the strategic path toward European Union (EU) integration, and Albania's role within the international community. The presidential family then proceeded to the Presidenca on the Dëshmorët e Kombit Boulevard for the formal transfer of duties from his predecessor, Ilir Meta. This ceremony was attended by approximately 400 distinguished guests, encompassing prominent figures from the political, academic, media, and religious sectors. During his final moments, Meta engaged in a ceremonial handshake with Begaj, after which Vitore Tusha, the chair of the constitutional court, presented the foundational law of the nation to the newly inaugurated president.

Begaj reaffirmed his commitment to the constitution and legal framework of Albania, pledging to uphold the rights and freedoms of citizens, protect the sovereignty of the nation, and promote the prosperity of the Albanian people. He articulated his intention to be a servant of the people and to support the Euro-Atlantic aspirations of all Albanians, including those in Kosovo, North Macedonia, Montenegro, the Presevo Valley, and other Albanian-speaking territories.

=== International reception ===
The inauguration of Begaj as the president generated several responses from international dignitaries:

- China – President Xi Jinping extended his congratulations, acknowledging the enduring friendship and bilateral relations between the two nations.
- European Union – President of the European Council Charles Michel and Vice-President of the European Commission Josep Borrell both congratulated Begaj, underlining the commitment of Albania and its integration into European structures.
- Kosovo – President Vjosa Osmani conveyed her congratulations, highlighting a commitment to strengthening diplomatic ties and advancing EU integration. Prime Minister Albin Kurti further highlighted the significance of cooperation in addressing mutual challenges and achieving shared objectives.
- Morocco – King Mohammed VI issued congratulations, reaffirming the commitment to enhance cooperation and contribute to the development in the Mediterranean.
- North Macedonia – President Stevo Pendarovski commended Begaj on his election, anticipating the continued strengthening of diplomatic relations between the nations.
- Oman – Sultan Haitham bin Tariq offered his congratulations, hoping for Begaj's success in guiding Albania towards prosperity, while also expressing optimism for the advancement of bilateral relations.
- Russia – President Vladimir Putin provided his congratulations to Begaj, expressing confidence in his capacity to excel in his responsibilities.
- Saudi Arabia – King Salman and Crown Prince Mohammed bin Salman both relayed their congratulations, articulating their aspirations for Begaj's success and the sustained prosperity of the Albanian people.
- United Arab Emirates – President Sheikh Mohamed bin Zayed Al Nahyan and Vice President Sheikh Mohammed bin Rashid Al Maktoum forwarded congratulatory messages on the occasion of Begaj's inauguration.

== See also ==
- Elections in Albania
- 2021 Albanian parliamentary election
