= List of international presidential trips made by Bujar Nishani =

This is a list of official trips made by Bujar Nishani as the 6th President of the Republic of Albania.

== State visits ==
The following international trips were made by President Bujar Nishani:

Date	Countries	Places visited	Narrative
30 August 2012	Kosovo	Pristina and Prizren	State visit in Kosovo.
14 September 2012	Macedonia	Skopje	State Visit
21-28 September 2012	United States	New York City	67th Session of the UN General Assembly
28 December 2012	Italy	Rome	State visit in Italy
17 February 2013	Kosovo	Pristina	Celebrations on the occasion of the 5th anniversary of the Independence of Kosovo.
12–13 June 2013	Slovakia	Bratislava	18th Central Europe Summit of Heads of State in Bratislava
19–20 June 2013	Israel	Jerusalem and Karmiel	State visit in Israel
1 July 2013	Croatia	Zagreb	Celebration in Zagreb on the occasion of the entry of Croatia into the European Union
24–28 September 2013	United States	New York City	68th Session of the UN General Assembly
25 June 2014	Romania	Bucharest	The Summit of Heads of States of the member countries of SEECP
24-26 August 2014	Austria	Alpbach	Meeting of the European Forum Alpbach
28 August 2014	Turkey	Ankara	Inauguration of President Erdogan
24–26 September 2014	United States	New York City	69th Session of the UN General Assembly
27 October 2014	Slovenia	Ljubljana	State visit in Slovenia
9–10 December 2014	United Kingdom	London	State visit in the UK
22–24 March 2015	Montenegro	Podgorica, Ulcinj, Tuzi	State visit in Montenegro
8–9 April 2015	Italy	Calabria	State visit on the centers inhabited by Arbëresh population in Calabria
25 April 2015	Turkey	Istanbul	Peace summit begins in Istanbul to commemorate Battle of Gallipoli centennial
8 June 2015	Montenegro	Budva	Brdo-Brijuni Process summit
6 October 2015	Bulgaria	Sofia	State visit in Bulgaria.
29 November 2015	France	Paris	United nations conference on climate change
24 February 2016	Bosnia and Herzegovina	Sarajevo	State visit in Bosnia and Herzegovina.
28 April 2016	Belgium	Brussels	Summit of NATO member states
9 May 2016	Croatia	Zagreb	State visit in Croatia.
1 July 2016	Austria	Vienna	The Crans-Montana Forum in Vienna
23–25 September 2016	United States	New York City and Chicago	71st Session of the UN General Assembly
5 October 2016	Jordan	Amman	State visit in Jordan
11 October 2016	Italy	Rome	Meeting with Albanian immigrants in Italy.
7 November 2016	Sovereign Military Order of Malta	Rome, Palazzo Malta	Official visit in the Sovereign Military Order of Malta
29 November 2016	Turkey	Istanbul	Bosphorus Summit in Istanbul
2 December 2016	Belgium	Brussels	Brussels conference on Albania's Communist-era crimes
18 December 2016	Germany	Berlin	The Annual Conference on Cultural Diplomacy
21–22 December 2016	Turkey	Ankara and Istanbul	State Visit in Turkey
7 March 2017	Serbia	Presevo and Bujanovac	The first visit of an Albanian head of state to Serbia, since Communist the visit of dictator Enver Hoxha in 1948. Nishani visited Bujanovac and Presevo, two municipalities in the south of Serbia where the majority of citizens are ethnic Albanians.
16–17 March 2017	Azerbaijan	Baku	Visited Baku to attend 5th Global Baku Forum
21–22 April 2017	Saudi Arabia	Riyadh	State Visit in Saudi Arabia
11–12 May 2017	Kosovo	Pristina, Prizren, Gjakova and Glogovac	State Visit in Kosovo
24–26 May 2017	Mexico	Cancún	Visit in Mexico at the invitation of UN Secretary General. Attending the 2017 Global Platform for Disaster Risk.
2–4 June 2017	Germany	Berlin	Visit in Germany to attend the 22nd International Berlin Meeting.
3 June 2017	Slovenia	Kranj	Visit for the Brdo-Brijuni Process summit.
1 July 2017	Germany	Berlin	Visit to attend the funeral of Helmut Kohl.

== See also ==
- Bujar Nishani
- President of Albania
- Politics of Albania
