= Spiro Moisiu =

Albanian resistance leader and general (1900–1981)

Major General Spiro Moisiu
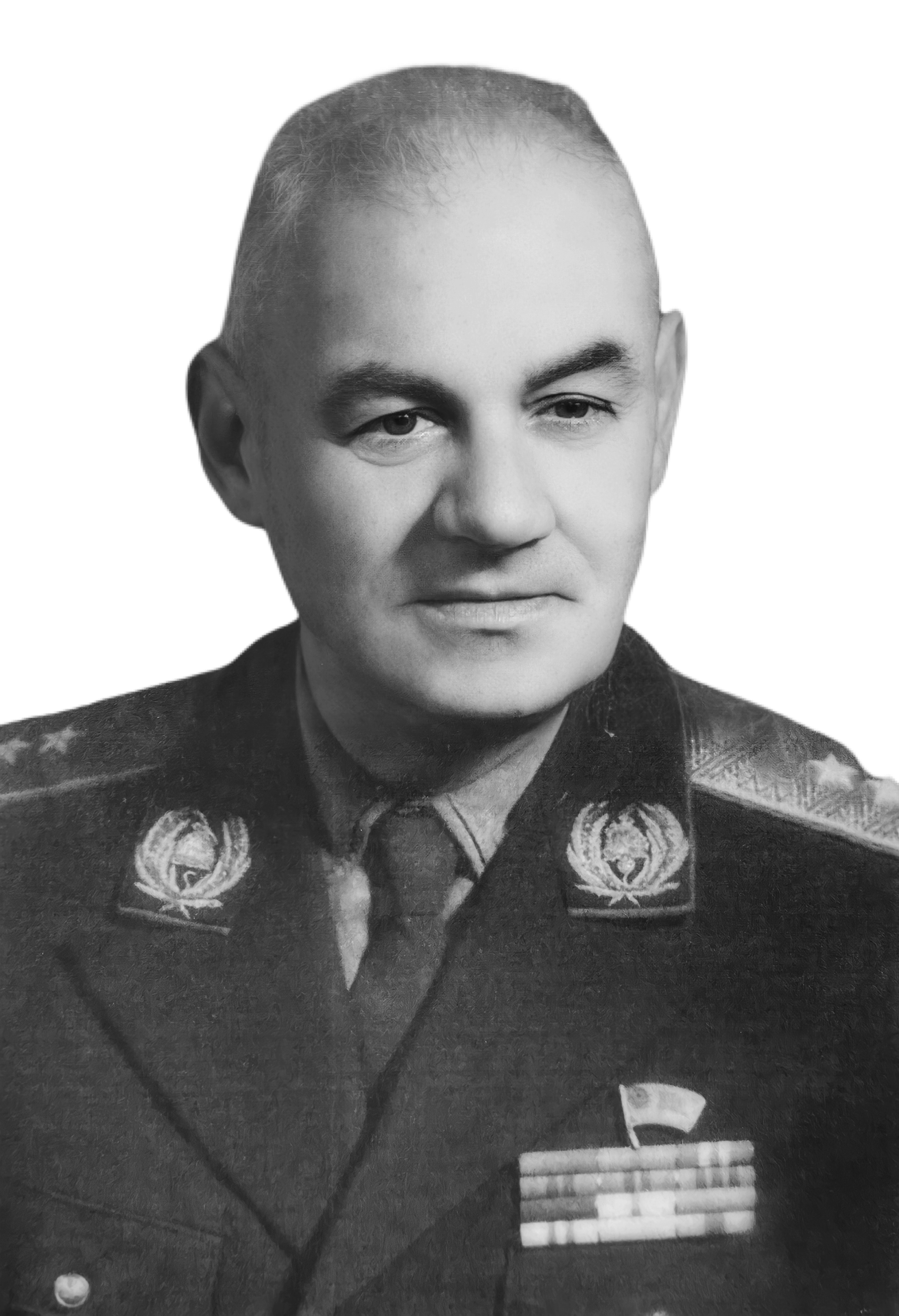
- Spiro Moisiu as Army Chief of Staff
- Born: 5 May 1900; Kavajë, Ottoman Empire
- Died: 12 April 1981 (aged 80); Tirana, Socialist Republic of Albania
- Spouse: Aspasi Druga
- Children: 3, including Alfred
- Military career
- Allegiance: Kingdom of Albania; Italian Protectorate of Albania; National Liberation Movement (LANÇ); People's Republic of Albania
- Branch: (Albanian Kingdom (1928–1939)) Royal Albanian Army; LANÇ; Albanian People's Army
- Rank: Major General

Spiro Theodori Moisiu, born as Spiro Koxhobashi (5 May 1900 – 12 April 1981), was the Major general of the Albanian National Liberation Army during World War II. He was the father of Alfred Moisiu, who eventually served as President of Albania.

== Early life ==
Spiro Moisiu was born on 5 May 1900 in Kavajë, to Theodori Moisiu, an educated merchant fluent in several languages, and Ana Stavri. Spiro's father came from the well-known Moisiu family of Kavajë which had roots in the city as far back as the 16th century. He was a close relative of the famous actor Alexander Moissi. Spiro's grandfather Gregor and Aleksandër's grandfather Kostandin were brothers and the sons of Themistokli Moisiu. Theodori was killed in 1913 by the rebels who opposed the Albanian government of Ismail Qemali. This left a young Spiro to be raised by his mother.

== Education ==
After finishing two elementary schools in Kavajë and Durrës he was sent to complete his education in a college in Vienna, Austria. He returned from Austria in 1919 and after following a military course directed by German and Austrian instructors in Tirana, he graduated as a lieutenant. In 1920, as a member of the Albanian governmental forces, Spiro was appointed to the protection forces of the Congress of Lushnje. Later that year he was appointed as a chief of staff of the Albanian government brigade fighting against Serb forces in the Martanesh area. During the uprising of June 1924, he supported the revolutionary forces led by Fan Noli. In December 1924, when Ahmet Zogu returned to Albania supported by Yugoslav forces, he fought against him in the Battle of Tujan. After Ahmet Zogu returned to power, Spiro Moisiu did not flee like the majority of his fellow soldiers but remained in Albania profiting from the amnesty that Zogu gave to most of those who had participated in the uprising.

== Military service under the Zog Monarchy ==
Admitting his excellent capacities Zogu reintegrated Spiro Moisiu in the Albanian governmental forces. His military career was advanced further in 1929–30 when he achieved excellent results at the military school of "Officers perfectionism" in Tirana under the direction of Italian instructors. After finishing first on his course among 43 other officers he was appointed as captain. During the Zog monarchy he served in different cities, while during the anti-governmental Insurrection of Fier in 1935, he maintained his loyalty to Zog fighting against the mutineers. During 1937–1938 he again achieved excellent results at military school in Tirana in studies for senior officers and graduated as major.

== Military service in World War II ==
=== Italian period ===
In April 1939 during the Italian fascist aggression he was the commander of border forces in the Shkodër region. He organised the forces at his disposal to make a stand in Shëngjin. Seeing the superiority of Italian forces and not wanting his forces to surrender to Italians, Spiro along with his men exiled to Yugoslavia and remained there until the beginning of 1940.

Accepting an invitation for his reinstatement into the Albanian governmental forces, Moisiu returned to Albania and at the end of 1940, while serving as the commander of Tomorri battalion, he was sent to the Italian-Greek front. Spiro did not want to fight against the Greeks and along with another Albanian major, Prenk Pervizi, withdrew his men from the front lines and induced many Albanians to desert. This caused him to be deported to a military post in Laç where he was kept under strict surveillance until the Italian High Military Court condemned him to death for desertion from the front lines. The sentence was later cancelled and his only punishment was dismissal from military service. This was because the Italians feared a mutiny of the Albanian soldiers who were still under Italian command.

=== Major General of the National Liberation Army ===
After his retirement from military service he was sent to the Berat region. He was there contacted by communists who in July 1943 proposed him to be the General Commander of Communist-dominated Albanian National Liberation Army (ANLA). He had the merit of turning the dispersed and not very well organised Albanian resistance forces into a regular army. Under his military leadership the ANLA was able to withstand two major offensives of the Germans in the winter of 1943-44 and in June 1944, while at the same time keeping the Germans under constant attacks; to win the war against the nationalist forces who opposed the ANLA, such as Balli Kombëtar, Legaliteti and others; and to liberate the country on November 29, 1944, Albania being the only country in Europe to have done so without the participation of Allied forces.

== After World War II ==
=== Opposition to Yugoslavia ===
He opposed the model proposed by the Yugoslavs for the reorganization of the Albanian army, and preferred Soviet instructors to Yugoslav ones. He sent many Albanian officers to Soviet military academies in order to create a new generation of Albanian officers.

=== Retirement ===
During a trial in 1946 one of the defendants testified that they had the support of Spiro Moisiu in a possible coup d'état. This led to his discharge from active duty and military service while he was only 46 years old. Spiro Moisiu was married to Aspasi Druga from the reputable Druga family of Kavajë. The couple had three children, Alfred, Jolanda and Arqile.

== See also ==
- History of Albania
- Military history of Albania during World War II
