= Presidential Office Building =

Presidential Office Building may refer to:

- Presidential Office Building (Kyiv)
- Presidential Office Building, Taipei
- Presidential Office Building, Tirana
- Presidential Palace (Nanjing)
