= 2002 electoral calendar =

National and federal elections held in 2002

This national electoral calendar for the year 2002 lists the national/federal direct elections to be held in 2002 in the de jure and de facto sovereign states. By-elections are excluded, though national referendums are included.

== January ==
- January 17 – The Gambia, parliamentary

== February ==
- February 24 – Laos, parliamentary

== March ==
- March 3 – São Tomé and Príncipe, legislative
- March 7 – Tonga, legislative
- March 9–11 Zimbabwe, presidential
- March 10
  - Republic of the Congo, presidential
  - Colombia, parliamentary
- March 17
  - Comoros, presidential (first round)
  - Portugal, legislative
- March 21 – Niue, legislative

== April ==
- April 7 – Hungary, presidential
- April 14
  - Comoros, presidential (second round)
  - East Timor, presidential
- April 21 – Chad, parliamentary
- April 28 – Mali, presidential (first round)

== May ==
- May 2
  - Bahamas, legislative
  - legislative
- May 5
  - In the second round of the French presidential election, Jacques Chirac is reelected.
  - Burkina Faso, parliamentary
- May 12 – Mali, presidential (run-off)
- May 14 – Sierra Leone, parliamentary and presidential
- May 15 – Dutch general election, 2002: The CDA has become the largest party and the right-wing LPF became the third largest. This was the beginning of Balkenende I cabinet which collapsed 84 days later.
- May 16 – Dominican Republic, parliamentary
- May 17 – Ireland, legislative
- May 25 – Lesotho, legislative
- May 26
  - Colombia, presidential
  - Republic of the Congo, parliamentary
- May 30 – Algeria, parliamentary

== June ==
- June 14–15 – Czech Republic, parliamentary
- June 24 – Albania, presidential
- June 30
  - Bolivia, presidential (run-off)
  - Cameroon, parliamentary
  - Guinea, parliamentary

== July ==
- July 14 – Mali, parliamentary
- July 15 – India, presidential
- July 25 – Tuvalu, parliamentary
- July 27 – The New Zealand Labour Party, is re-elected.

== September ==
September 15 – North Macedonia, parliamentary September 27 – Morocco, legislative

== October ==
- October 5
  - Bosnia and Herzegovina, legislative and presidential
- October 6 – Brazil, presidential and legislative
- October 7 – Trinidad and Tobago, legislative election
  - Latvia, parliamentary
- October 10 – Pakistan, general election
- October 16
  - Iraq, referendum
  - Jamaica, legislative
- October 20
  - Ecuador, legislative and presidential
  - Montenegro, parliamentary
- October 24 – Bahrain, legislative
- October 27
  - Luiz Inácio Lula da Silva is elected President of Brazil.
  - Togo, parliamentary

== November ==
- November 5 – United States: House of Representatives and Senate elections

== December ==
- December 6 – Seychelles, parliamentary
- December 8 – Serbia, presidential
- December 12 – Hans Enoksen is elected prime minister of Greenland.
- December 15
  - Equatorial Guinea, presidential
  - Madagascar, parliamentary
- December 19 – South Korea, presidential
- December 22
  - Lithuania, presidential (first round)
  - Montenegro, presidential
- December 27 – Kenya, presidential, and legislative
