= 2007 Albanian presidential election =

Election of Bamir Topi

- 20 June - 20 July 2007
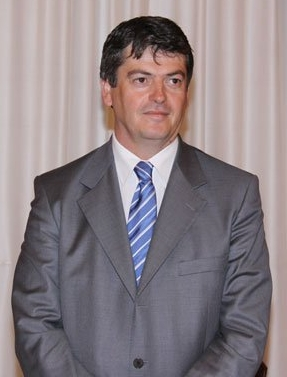
Nominee	Bamir Topi
Party	PD
Popular vote	85 of 140 MPs
President before election
Alfred Moisiu
Independent
Elected President
Bamir Topi
PD

Indirect presidential elections were held in Albania on 20 and 27 June, 8, 11, 14, and 20 July, the sixth such elections since the collapse of the communist regime in 1991.

The President of Albania is elected through a secret vote and without debate by the Parliament of Albania by a majority of three-fifths majority of all its members. The Constitution of Albania sets a limit to a maximum of two terms in office. When this majority is not reached in the first round of voting, a second round takes place within seven days. If such a majority is still not reached, a third round must take place within a further period of seven days. If even in the first three rounds no candidate has attained the necessary majority, a further two rounds must be held within seven days, with the majority needed to win being reduced to an absolute majority (50% + 1 vote) vote of the total members of the Parliament. If after five rounds of voting no candidate has attained the necessary majority outlined for each round of voting in the Parliament, the Parliament will be dissolved and a general election must occur within 60 days.

== Early elections ==
In 2002, Alfred Moisiu was elected as a consensual president and was accepted by both the majority and the opposition parties. The parties would not agree to reelect Moisiu despite his agreement to stand as a compromise candidate. Neither Bamir Topi of the right nor Fatos Nano or Edi Rama of the left had the necessary supermajority in parliament, and therefore it was considered to be very likely that early elections would have to be held after five failed attempts to elect the president.

The prime minister at the time and former President Sali Berisha had advocated for a president elected by direct popular suffrage, but due to lack of time such changes could not take place before the 2007 elections.

On 12 July 2007, Rama officially called for early elections. A majority of Albanians were against early elections.

== Vote ==
In the first two attempts for the first round of voting (on 20 June and 27 June), no candidate was presented. On 5 July 2007, the government and the opposition presented their proposed candidate lists, but did not accept either list; they agreed to meet on 6 July 2007 to start another attempt on finding a consensus candidate, which failed. (The opposition had proposed Albania's military representative to NATO, Brig. Gen. Arjan Zaimi, as a compromise candidate, but the government rejected him.) They then set the third attempt of the first round of voting (the first one to actually see any candidate stand for the post) for 8 July. Topi was the official nominee of the ruling coalition, while Nano did not stand as the opposition's candidate (his own party does not support him as a candidate), but de facto as an independent.

=== First round ===
The first round of voting on 8 July gave the following results (the opposition boycotted the vote due to the lack of a consensus candidate).

- Bamir Topi: 75 votes
- Fatos Nano: 3 votes

=== Second round ===
The second round on 11 July was again boycotted by the opposition and had the following results:

- Bamir Topi: 74 votes (84 votes were necessary to secure the post)
- Fatos Nano: 5 votes

=== Third round ===
While the opposition continued its boycott on 14 July in the third round, a new candidate entered the field: Neritan Ceka, the leader of the opposition Democratic Alliance Party. Since he and Topi got the most votes, they proceeded to the fourth round. For the first time, more than the 84 members of parliament necessary for a valid election were present.

- Bamir Topi: 50 votes
- Neritan Ceka: 32 votes
- Fatos Nano: 3 votes

=== Fourth round ===
In the fourth and potentially penultimate round on 20 July, 90 parliamentarians were present, including ten from the opposition. The results this time were:

- Bamir Topi: 85 votes
- Neritan Ceka: 5 votes

These surprising results stifled the impending early elections; Topi's election was only possible because five opposition members voted for him instead of Ceka.

== See also ==
- Politics of Albania
- President of Albania
