= 2002 Albanian presidential election =

Election of Alfred Moisiu

- 24 June 2002
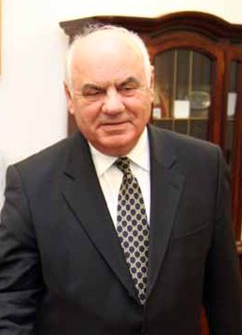
Nominee	Alfred Moisiu
Party	Independent
Popular vote	97 of 140 MPs
President before election
Rexhep Meidani
PS
Elected President
Alfred Moisiu
Independent

Indirect presidential elections were held in Albania on 24 June 2002, the fifth such elections since the collapse of the communist regime in 1991. Under pressure from international organization, Alfred Moisiu was chosen by Sali Berisha and Fatos Nano as a consensus candidate for the presidency after the end of Rexhep Meidani's term. Moisiu was found fitting for that post since he was a researcher, was politically neutral, was known as an effective mediator (a quality much appreciated in Albania, which tends to inner quarrels) and had a decisive pro-Western and NATO orientation.

The medias in Albania emphasized the extraordinary cooperative spirit between the Socialist and the Democratic Parties; Moisiu was a candidate approved by both Sali Berisha and Fatos Nano. Neither Nano nor former president Meidani ran for the presidency, as they had no chance to gather the necessary three fifths of the vote. Meidani was found to be too close to the Socialists, and therefore conservative candidates would not support him.

The President of Albania is elected through a secret vote and without debate by the Parliament of Albania by a majority of three-fifths majority of all its members. The Constitution of Albania sets a limit to a maximum of two terms in office. When this majority is not reached in the first round of voting, a second round takes place within seven days. If such a majority is still not reached, a third round must take place within a further period of seven days. If even in the first three rounds no candidate has attained the necessary majority, a further two rounds must be held within seven days, with the majority needed to win being reduced to an absolute majority (50% + 1 vote) vote of the total members of the Parliament. If after five rounds of voting no candidate has attained the necessary majority outlined for each round of voting in the Parliament, the Parliament will be dissolved and a general election must occur within 60 days.

== Results ==
Candidate	Votes	%
Alfred Moisiu	97	83.62
Against	19	16.38
Total	116	100.00
Valid votes	116	96.67
Invalid/blank votes	4	3.33
Total votes	120	100.00
Registered voters/turnout	140	85.71
