= Linda Rama =

Albanian economist

Spouse of the Prime Minister of Albania
- Incumbent
- Assumed role 11 September 2013
- Preceded by: Liri Berisha

Personal details
- Born: Linda Basha; December 30, 1964 (age 61) Tirana, PR Albania
- Spouse: Edi Rama (m. 2010)
- Children: 1
- Occupation: Economist, author

Linda Rama (nee Basha; born December 30, 1964) is an Albanian senior economist (Doctor of Economic Science), researcher, university lecturer, women and children's rights advocate. She is spouse of Prime Minister Edi Rama.

== Early life and education ==
Rama was born in Tirana on December 30, 1964. Her father was a musician who played the horn, and her mother worked at the administration department of the former auto-tractor plant. She attended Kosova Elementary School, and the eight-year "20 Vjetori" School in Tirana. She studied industrial chemistry, economics, and industrial economy, at the University of Tirana. In 1987, Rama started teaching part-time at the university while beginning her professional career at the Textile Plant in Tirana. In 1992, one year after the fall of communism in Albania, she left the country to pursue her master's in economics at the Central European University in Prague, after which she returned to Albania. In 1996, she obtained a Ph.D. in economic science, with a thesis on "The Economic Reform and Mass Privatisation in Albania." Upon completing her studies, Rama went back to work as a lecturer of International Finance, and she later taught Public Policy and Public Risk Management at the European University of Tirana.

== Career ==
Rama's first professional experience was at the Textile Plant in Tirana, From 1993 to 1999 was the Head of the Privatization of Large and Strategic Companies and General Director of the National Agency for Privatization. In March 1999, she co-founded the Human Development Promotion Centre (HDPC).

Rama has served in various positions in the course of her professional life as a member, and chair of the board of the Open Society Foundation in Albania (2005–2010), member of the board of directors of the American Bank of Investment (2015–2018), lecturer of international finance at the University of Tirana, School of Economics, and lecturer of public policies and risk management at the European University of Tirana. Her research interests are driven by her concern for marginalized groups, like children, women, and people with disabilities. In 2001, she co-founded the Albanian Children Alliance.

== Public profile ==
He is author, co-author and expert in many studies, research and policy papers in the field of governance, human development, labour market, education, social welfare, private sector development in Albania and the region.

In 2001, together with the representatives of six other civil society organizations, Rama co-founded the Albanian Children Alliance, an Albanian-based civil society movement aimed at protecting the rights of children, part of the larger Global Children's Movement, under the motto, “Say YES for Children”. Rama has attended numerous important fora and summits on human rights, including the Global Women Summit held in Tirana, Global Women Club Kosovo, Forum of Women in Leadership in Dubai, Young Muslim Women Summit, UN ECOSOC Youth Forum, etc. She joined the appeal issued by Women's Entrepreneurship Day of the Cherie Blair Foundation, in support of women entrepreneurs from low- and middle-income countries, with the likes of Cherie Blair, Hillary Clinton, and other international personalities and later a second appeal, “Pave the Way to Girls”. In March 2022, Mrs Rama sent a message of solidarity to Olena Zelenska and the people of Ukraine

== Personal life ==
Rama married Thanas Xhillari in 1989 and they share a daughter, Rea Xhillari. Since 2010, she has been married to Edi Rama, the 33d Prime Minister of the Republic of Albania. They have a son, Zaho Rama, born in 2014.
