= Teuta Topi =

First Lady of Albania

First Lady of Albania
- In role 24 July 2007 – 24 July 2012
- President: Bamir Topi
- Preceded by: Milica Moisiu
- Succeeded by: Odeta Nishani

Personal details
- Born: Teuta Mema; 13 June 1962 (age 63) Tirana, Albania
- Spouse: Bamir Topi
- Children: 2

Teuta Topi (née Mema; born 13 June 1962) was the first lady of Albania from 2007 to 2012 as the wife of former President Bamir Topi.

== Biography ==
Topi, born in Tirana on 13 June 1962, graduated from Petro Nini Luarasi High School in Tirana and earned her college degree in 1984, majoring in Agronomy from the Agricultural University of Tirana.

She has also earned a master's degree in Environmental Sciences and Technology. Teuta has a long professional experience working as specialist in the Entity of Seeds and Saplings and also as a specialist of the rural development in the Ministry of Agriculture, Food and Protection of the Consumer of Albania. She has expanded her professional experience with domestic qualifications and studying abroad Mississippi State University, United States.

Mrs. Topi is a member of the Work Group for rural development in the Balkans; representative of the Ministry of Agriculture of Albania to the IRENE Project, the INTERREG III Program for the Regional Development o Local Basis; member of the Work Group to draft the strategy of regional development and member of the Technical Work Group on the collaboration in the agricultural field with the neighboring countries. The First Lady has not been involved in politics, but she has been active in programs of social and public interest such as in issue of gender pertinence or in issues of European integration and the Association-Stabilization process.

In 1982 she met and later on married Bamir Topi. Bamir and Teuta have two daughters: Nada (born 1984) and Etida (born 1989). Mrs. Topi has not interrupted her professional activity in the Ministry of Agriculture, while her activity as First Lady dedicates her time to the most needy levels of the society.
