= Petrit Ago =

General Director of Customs of Albania

- Occupation: Customs director
- Relatives: Erbi Ago (son)

Petrit Ago is the former General Director of Customs of Albania and former head of Tirana taxation office. As customs director, he replaced in his new position Ardian Maci. Ago vowed to stick to the pledge of Ministry of Finance in fighting contraband and corruption at customs offices. Ago was also the counselor of former Albanian President, Rexhep Meidani. Ago is currently a businessman. In 2015, he was president of Impuls sh.p.k

== Family links ==
Ago is also the father of the Albanian American movie actor and model Erbi Ago.
