= Arjan Zaimi =

Albania's representative to NATO (born 1957)

General Major Arjan Zaimi (born 1957) is Albania's representative to NATO.

In 2007, he was the first contender to be the President of Albania after the negotiations of majority and opposition for the consensual name of the head of state.
