= Liri Berisha =

Albanian pediatrician (born 1948)

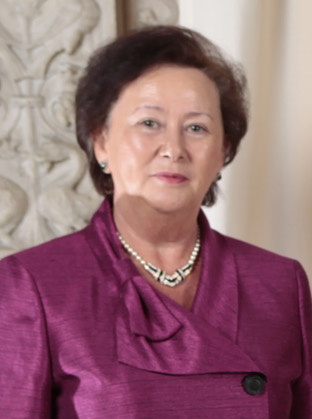
- Berisha in 2009

Spouse of the Prime Minister of Albania
- In role 8 September 2005 – 11 September 2013
- Prime Minister: Sali Berisha
- Preceded by: Xhoana Nano
- Succeeded by: Linda Rama

First Lady of Albania
- In role 9 April 1992 – 24 July 1997
- President: Sali Berisha
- Preceded by: Semiramis Xhuvani (1986)
- Succeeded by: Lidra Meidani

Personal details
- Born: Slobodanka Ramaj; 5 July 1948 (age 78) Tirana, Albania
- Spouse: Sali Berisha (m. 1971)
- Children: 2
- Parents: Rexhep Ramaj Balidemaj; Milica Bulatović
- Education: University of Tirana (MD)
- Occupation: Pediatrician

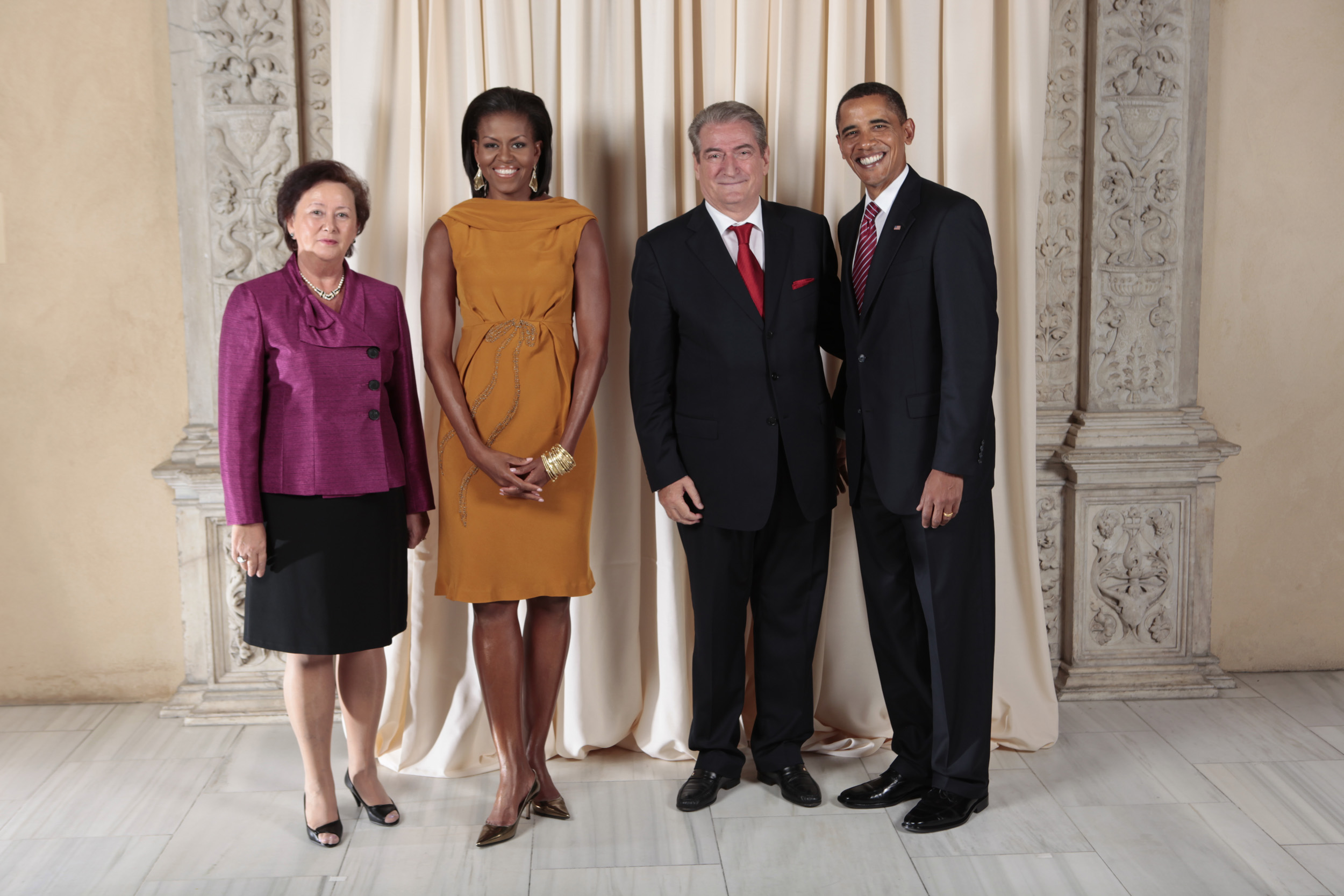
Sali and Liri Berisha with Barack and Michelle Obama, September 2009

Liri Berisha (born Slobodanka Ramaj; 5 July 1949) is an Albanian pediatrician, former first lady of Albania and the president of the Albanian Children Foundation, and also a UNICEF ambassador.

She is married to Sali Berisha, the former President and Prime Minister of Albania, with whom she has two children, daughter Argita and son Shkëlzen.

== Early life and career ==
Liri Berisha was born Slobodanka Ramaj. She is the daughter of Rexhep Ramaj Balidemaj, an ethnic Albanian from Martinovići near Plav, at the time part of Yugoslavia (now Montenegro), and Milica Bulatović, a Montenegrin woman. After the Yugoslav–Albanian split in 1948, her name was changed by the government to Liri Ramaj

In 2008, Berisha founded the Mother Teresa Cultural Foundation. In 2009, the Women's Information Network named Berisha "Woman of the Year".

Berisha joined Autism Speaks in 2011 in celebrating the opening of a new centre for autistic children in Albania, calling the centre a way to improve the lives of children with autism there.
