= Amik Kasoruho =

Albanian author, translator and publicist

Amik Kasoruho (20 November 1932 – 4 May 2014) was an Albanian author, translator and publicist who formerly served as a cultural affairs advisor to the president of the Republic of Albania. He is known for having translated Dan Brown's The Da Vinci Code. One of his last major translations into Albanian was Ayn Rand's "Atlas Shrugged".
