= Artur Kuko =

Albanian diplomat

Artur Kuko (born 16 April 1962) is an Albanian diplomat and former Permanent Representative to NATO of Albania. Kuko was Ambassador to Belgium and Luxembourg from 1992 to 1994 and again from 2002 to 2007. He was also the Ambassador to the European Union from 1992 to 1997 and again from 2002 to 2007.

== See also ==
- Albanian Permanent Representative to NATO
