= Bujar Nishani =

President of Albania from 2012 to 2015

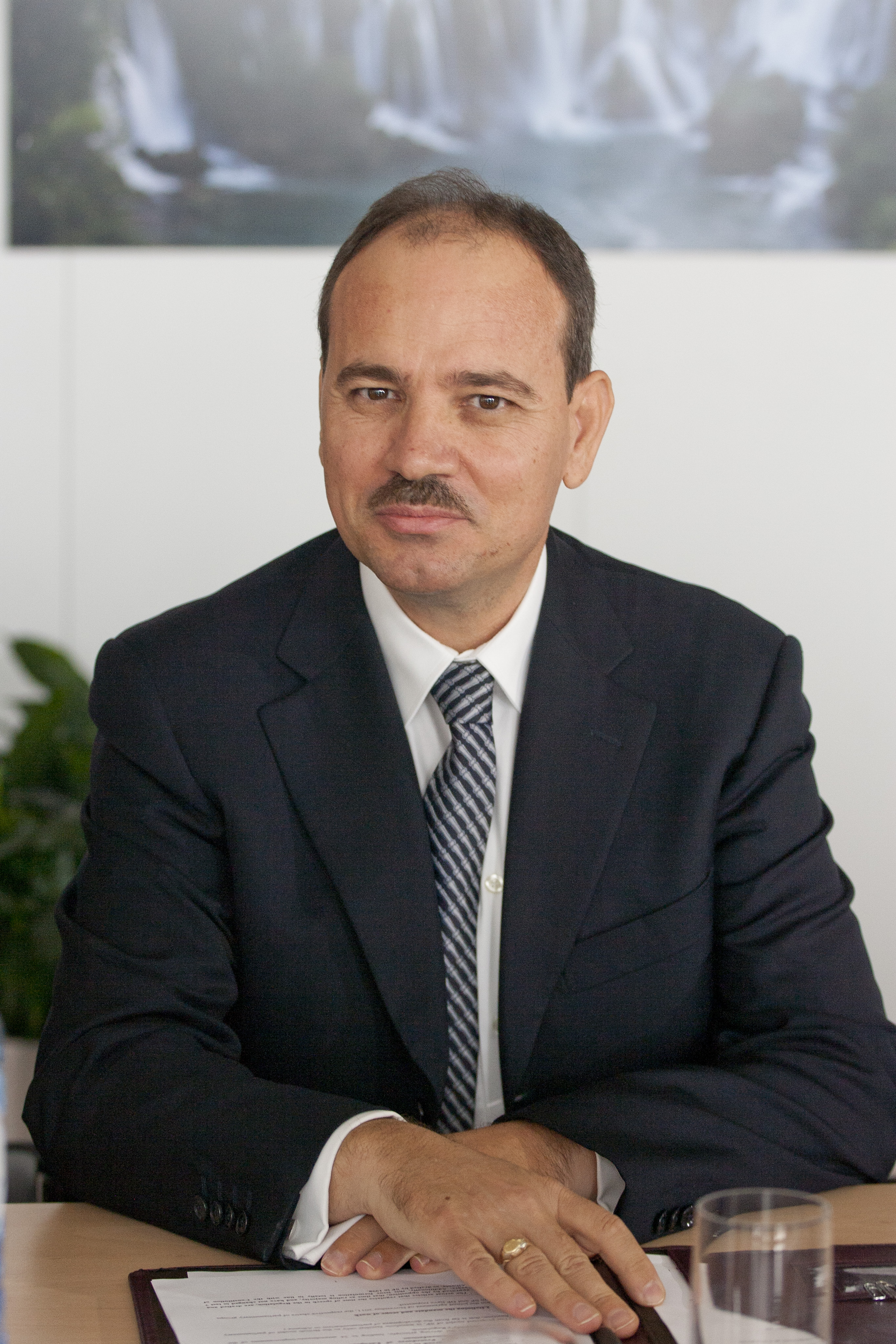
- Nishani in 2012

6th President of Albania
- In office 24 July 2012 – 24 July 2017
- Prime Minister: Sali Berisha; Edi Rama
- Preceded by: Bamir Topi
- Succeeded by: Ilir Meta

Minister of the Interior
- In office 21 April 2011 – 12 June 2012
- Prime Minister: Sali Berisha
- Preceded by: Lulzim Basha
- Succeeded by: Flamur Noka
- In office 20 March 2007 – 17 September 2009
- Prime Minister: Sali Berisha
- Preceded by: Gjergj Lezhja (Acting)
- Succeeded by: Lulzim Basha

Minister of Justice
- In office 17 September 2009 – 25 April 2011
- Prime Minister: Sali Berisha
- Preceded by: Enkelejd Alibeaj
- Succeeded by: Eduard Halimi

Personal details
- Born: Bujar Faik Nishani; 29 September 1966 Durrës, PR Albania
- Died: 28 May 2022 (aged 55) Charité University Hospital, Berlin, Germany
- Party: Democratic Party (before 2012; 2015–2022); Independent (2012–2019)
- Spouse: Odeta Kosova (m. 1994)
- Children: Ersi Nishani (Son) and Fiona Nishani (Daughter)
- Education: Skanderbeg Military University; Naval Postgraduate School; University of Tirana

Bujar Faik Nishani (Albanian pronunciation: [bujaɾ ni'ʃani]; 29 September 1966 – 28 May 2022) was an Albanian politician who served as President of Albania from 2012 to 2017.

Nishani was the youngest person to have been chosen as president of Albania, taking office at the age of 47. Before his election as president, Nishani held a number of governmental and diplomatic positions. Namely, he served as Minister of Internal Affairs from 2007 to 2009, and again between 2011 and 2012, as well as Minister of Justice from 2009 to 2011.

== Early life ==
Nishani was born in Durrës, Albania on 29 September 1966 to a couple of teachers with roots from Gjirokastër. He was a distant relative of Omer Nishani, Chairman of the People's Socialist Republic of Albania's Presidium, but during communism Bujar changed his surname to Mehmeti.

He graduated at the Skanderbeg Military University in 1988, and followed up in 1996 with master's studies on "defense resources management" in the United States at the Naval Postgraduate School. In 2004, he graduated from the Law Faculty of University of Tirana, where he also studied jurisprudence. He completed his master's degree in European studies in 2005.

== Political career ==
After the fall of communism in Albania in 1991, Nishani joined the Democratic Party of Albania (DP). With the appointment of Safet Zhulali as Minister of Defense in 1992, he was hired as the ministry's expert and Director of Foreign Relations. Two years later, in 1994, he changed to the Ministry of Foreign Affairs coordinating the NATO Relations Office. In 1996 he returned to work as Chief of Staff to Safet Zhulali, then Minister of Defence, a position he held until the Democratic Party lost the 1997 parliamentary election.

In 2001, Nishani was elected as general secretary of the DP's branch in Tirana and in the 2003 local election obtained a seat in the Tirana Municipal Council. Following his electoral success Nishani became a member of the DP's National Council two years later and subsequently became a member of the party's central presidency.

Nishani won a seat for Tirana's 34th constituency in the 2005 parliamentary election beating then Minister of Interior Igli Toska. He was re-elected in 2009.

He became Minister of Interior on 20 March 2007, a post he held until 17 September 2009. Following the 2009 parliamentary election Nishani was appointed as Minister of Justice, an office he held between 17 September 2009 and 25 April 2011. Following the resignation of Lulzim Basha as Minister of Interior to run for Mayor of Tirana, Nishani was appointed again as Minister of Interior until June 2012.

=== President of Albania ===
On 10 June 2012, the day before the fourth round of presidential election in Parliament, the governing coalition met to discuss new candidates for the country's presidency, as the previous three rounds of voting had failed to elect a candidate. The proposed list of candidates from this meeting included the name of Bujar Nishani, then Minister of the Interior, but it was agreed that the ruling party's candidate would be Artan Hoxha. The following day, Hoxha, withdrew his candidacy due to fierce criticism from the opposition. After the vote was postponed for the afternoon, the governing coalition finally proposed Nishani. In the parliamentary session, Nishani won the vote with 73 votes, being voted only by the governing coalition. Deputies of the then in opposition, Socialist Party, did not participate in the voting despite being present. Bujar Nishani was sworn in on 24 July 2012, becoming the country's youngest president ever; in his inaugural speech, he announced that his priority was to reform the judicial system, as well as Albania's integration into the European Union.

His first state visit abroad was in Kosovo in August 2012 setting a precedent for future Albanian Heads of State. After meeting with President Atifete Jahjaga, Nishani expressed Albania's support for Kosovo's independence, stating that it was irreversible and that dialogue was necessary to resolve any problems with Serbia. The Kosovar issue was high on his diplomatic agenda. In 2013, he did not attend the summit of ministers of the South-East European Cooperation Process, which was held on 31 May in Macedonia, because, due to objections from Serbia, the president of Kosovo was not invited. In 2016, he called on the United Nations to recognize Kosovo's independence.

On 16 November 2012, Nishani received the body of the King Zog I, who had died in exile more than 50 years earlier.

In July 2013, he called a referendum on 22 December for citizens to decide on trash imports to the country. In August 2013 he ignored opposition from the head of the Albanian Armed Forces, Xhemal Gjunkshi, and transferred ownership of a large building in Tirana from the Army to the Democratic Party of Albania for the party's new headquarters. After the September parliamentary election, he named Edi Rama as the new Prime Minister.

Nishani demanded to the President of Greece Karolos Papoulias, in November 2013, that the Greek parliament abolish the war against Albania, declared in 1940, in an attempt to resolve above all the Cham issue. He added that Albania was ready to resolve the maritime border delimitation dispute with Greece in accordance with international law.

In 2014, he criticized the lack of transparency in the process of approval of the package of laws on the armed forces and the Defense Intelligence and Security Agency, and rejected the reform of the Albanian judicial system, as he considered that it should be carried out by judges and not politicians.

Due to the protests in Macedonia in May 2015 in which several protesters died, he called to "investigate as soon as possible and shed light quickly and completely on this dark and unclear incident that has shaken not only Kumanovo, but also the international community".

The parliament, on 17 December 2015, passed the law prohibiting those with a criminal record for certain serious crimes from holding public office. In an unusual gesture, Nishani presented a decree for the law to take effect the same moment of parliamentary approval.

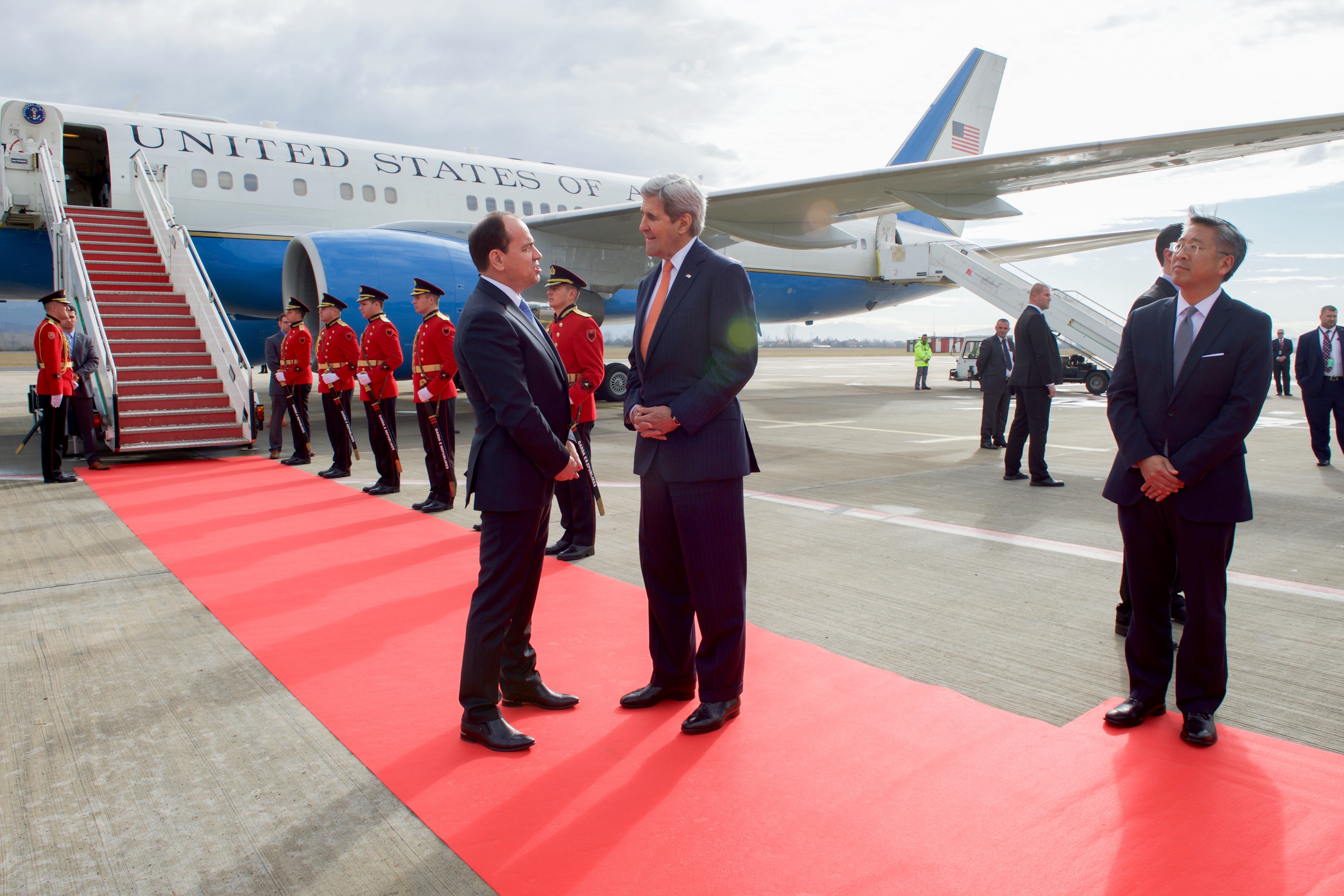
Nishani meets with John Kerry during his official visit in Tirana on 14 February 2016.

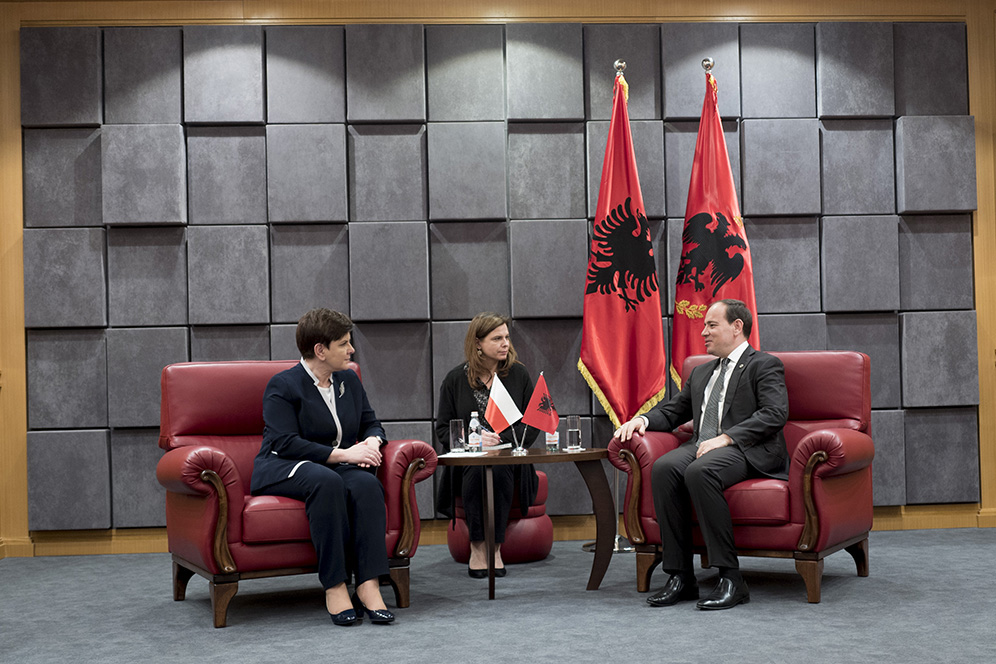
Nishani meets with the Polish Prime Minister, Beata Szydło in Tirana, on 9 December 2016.

In April 2016, he opposed the law presented by the government equating citizenship with arms, considering it "inadequate" and "not positive" The election of nine new Supreme Court judges on 26 June 2016 caused much controversy at the top of the judiciary, as five of them accused Nishani and president of the Supreme Court of acting without complying with the legally prescribed form.

During his final address to the United Nations, at the 71st Session of the UN General Assembly in September 2016, he stated that Albania would address global challenges in close cooperation with others, and that Albania's actions would include increasing humanitarian aid, ratifying the Paris Agreement on climate change and implementing all commitments in the security realm.

During most state visits abroad, Nishani's policy was maximally oriented towards strengthening good-neighborly relations, citing its support for Kosovo's participation in all multilateral regional and international activities.

Nishani's term ended on 24 July 2017 and was succeeded by Ilir Meta, who took office after winning the 2017 Albanian presidential election.

== Personal life and death ==
Nishani was married to Odeta Nishani with whom he had two children, a son Ersi and a daughter Fiona. He was fluent in English. He was Bektashi and on 21 April 2017, he became the first Albanian president to make a pilgrimage to Mecca.

In 2008, he underwent surgery for a cerebral cavernoma; and retook his duties as Minister of Interior only two weeks after.

Nishani was admitted to hospital for complications of pneumonia caused by post-COVID-19 fibrosis left in his lungs. On 23 April 2022, he was transferred to Germany for specialized treatment. He died in Berlin, Germany at 7 a.m. (06 UTC) of 28 May 2022, at the age of 55. In the afternoon of 31 May, his body arrived in the country from Germany with a hearse crossing the Kosovo-Albania border Morina. After the arrival, his body was lay in state in the Presidential Palace. The government declared a day of national mourning for 2 June. The state funeral took place on that day, from 10:00 to 12:00 and Nishani was buried in the Sharra public cemetery in Tirana.

== Honours ==
- Honorary Citizen of Libohova, Albania (2013)
- Honorary Citizen of Shkodër, Albania (2016)
- Honorary Citizen of Prizren, Kosovo (2017)
- Honorary Citizen of Glogovac, Kosovo (2017)

=== Foreign honours ===
- Knight Grand Cross with Collar of the Order of Merit of the Italian Republic (2014)
- Raoul Wallenberg Award (United States, 2015)
- First class Order of the Balkan Mountains (Bulgaria, 2016)
- Collar of the Order pro Merito Melitensi (Order of Malta, 2016)
- Order of Freedom (Kosovo, 2017)

== See also ==
- List of state visits made by Bujar Nishani
- Politics of Albania

Political offices
Preceded by Gjergj Lezhja; Acting	Minister of the Interior; 2007–2009	Succeeded by Lulzim Basha
Preceded by Enkelejd Alibeaj	Minister of Justice; 2009–2011	Succeeded by Eduard Halimi
Preceded by Lulzim Basha	Minister of the Interior; 2011–2012	Succeeded by Flamur Noka
Preceded by Bamir Topi	President of Albania; 2012–2017	Succeeded by Ilir Meta
