= 2007 Pitcairnese general election =

Elections in the Pitcairn Islands

General elections were held in the Pitcairn Islands on 9 December 2007. Mike Warren was elected mayor, replacing the incumbent Jay Warren, who came in second place in a three-way contest. The Island Council was also renewed.
