= 2007 Egyptian constitutional referendum =

- 26 March 2007

Results
Choice	Votes	%
Yes	7,172,436	75.94%
No	2,272,683	24.06%
Valid votes	9,445,119	97.39%
Invalid or blank votes	252,659	2.61%
Total votes	9,697,778	100.00%
Registered voters/turnout	35,865,660	27.04%

A constitutional referendum was held in Egypt on 26 March 2007. The amendments to the constitution were mostly concerning electoral law, and had been passed by Parliament on 20 March 2007. Government critics accused President Hosni Mubarak of deliberately having hastened the schedule (the referendum had originally been expected on 4 April 2007) in order to make it impossible for them to organise a strong "no" campaign.

According to official results, 76% of voters were in favour of the reforms, with an official turnout of 27%. Government critics claimed the turnout was actually around 5%.

== Results ==
Choice	Votes	%
For	7,172,436	75.94
Against	2,272,683	24.06
Total	9,445,119	100.00
Valid votes	9,445,119	97.39
Invalid/blank votes	252,659	2.61
Total votes	9,697,778	100.00
Registered voters/turnout	35,865,660	27.04
Source: IFES
