= 2003 Albanian local elections =

- 12 October 2003

The Albanian local elections in 2003 was the fourth local election held in Albania.
