= Odeta Nishani =

First Lady of Albania

First Lady of Albania
- In role 24 July 2012 – 24 July 2017
- President: Bujar Nishani
- Preceded by: Teuta Topi
- Succeeded by: Monika Kryemadhi

Personal details
- Born: Odeta Ali Kosova; May 5, 1969 (age 57) Elbasan, Albania
- Spouse: Bujar Nishani (m. 1994; died 2022)
- Children: 2
- Education: Polytechnic University of Tirana; Aleksandër Moisiu University
- Website: First Lady of Albania

Odeta Nishani (born, Odeta Kosova, on 5 May 1969 in Elbasan, Albania) is the widow of the 6th President of Albania, Bujar Nishani. Her father originates from a merchant family from Gjakova, who settled in Durrës in 1905, hence the origin of her surname Kosova. Her mother comes from the Karaosmani family and her grandfather Qemal Karaosmani, was one of the signatories of the Independence Act and who served as Minister of Agriculture in Ismail Qemali’s government.

Odeta grew up in Elbasan and she completed her pre-higher education at Dhaskal Todri High School.

After that, she graduated in Civil and Industrial Construction Engineering form Polytechnic University of Tirana in 1993. She married Bujar Nishani in 1994.

Odeta started her professional career as Investments Director at the Military Academy and she continued for a decade as a Constructions' Engineer and Constructer at the Institute of Studies and Projects. The status of the First Lady, found Mrs. Nishani in the field of Tourism Development professionally serving as Director of Market Study and Tourism Statistics at the Ministry of Tourism, Culture, Youth and Sports. Mrs. Nishani holds a master's degree in Tourism Management – a field where she has been contributing during the seven recent years.
