= 2007 Latvian security laws referendum =

Proposed repealing of the laws in Latvia

- 7 July 2007
- Are you for the repealing of the law “Amendments to the National Security Law” of March 1, 2007?
- Outcome: The proposal failed as voter turnout was below 453,730, half of the votes cast in the last Saeima elections.

Results
| Choice | Votes | % |
|---|---|---|
| For | 326,479 | 96.97% |
| Against | 10,207 | 3.03% |
| Valid votes | 336,686 | 99.51% |
| Invalid or blank votes | 1,662 | 0.49% |
| Total votes | 338,348 | 100.00% |
| Registered voters/turnout | 1,497,946 | 22.59% |

2007 Latvian security laws referendum
- Are you for the repealing of the law “Amendments to the State Security Authorities Law” of March 1, 2007?
- Outcome: The proposal failed as voter turnout was below 453,730, half of the votes cast in the last Saeima elections.

Results
| Choice | Votes | % |
|---|---|---|
| For | 326,189 | 96.89% |
| Against | 10,459 | 3.11% |
| Valid votes | 336,648 | 99.50% |
| Invalid or blank votes | 1,694 | 0.50% |
| Total votes | 338,342 | 100.00% |
| Registered voters/turnout | 1,497,946 | 22.59% |

A referendum on two proposed security laws was held in Latvia on 7 July 2007; the referendum had been called after the president refused to sign the laws, claiming possible influence of oligarchs on Latvia's national security, and after 212,000 signatures had been collected, meeting the requirement of about 150,000 signatures. Although the referendum failed to reach the quorum of 453,730 votes, the results showed massive disapproval of the amendments.

== Background ==
The President of Latvia has the power, as established by the constitution, to request that the Saeima reconsider a law; if the Saeima does not amend the law, then the president must sign it or suspend the law for two months. After this period the law must either be proclaimed or put to a national referendum, if 10% of the electorate request this. President Vaira Vīķe-Freiberga deemed the amendments in national security laws to be a threat to national security. As the Saeima did not amend the laws accordingly, the president used her power to suspend the laws. She said that she saw that the laws give employees of organizations granting access to classified information the right to grant such permission to themselves, which could result in certain groups and individuals having the ability to manipulate the information in their own interests. After the suspension, the Saeima did amend the laws as the president had originally requested, and the leaders of the governing coalition claimed that there was no need for a referendum given that the original amendments had already been ruled out and would come into force only for a day. However, this led to calls of citizens to use their right to vote and speculation that the president could dissolve the Saeima. Thus, the referendum was unofficially seen as a referendum over the resignation of Kalvītis' government and as a chance to show support for the popular president, who, coincidentally, left office on the day the referendum took place, rather than as a referendum on the amendments to the security laws.

== Legal details ==
Given that the Saeima had already cancelled the laws, if there had been no referendum, after the end of the suspension period the laws would have come into force for one day; the same would happen if a majority voted "Against" repealing the laws. However, if a majority voted "For" repealing the laws, the Saeima would not be able to revive the laws until the end of the current term of the Saeima. Furthermore, there is a requirement that at least half as many votes as in the last Saeima elections must be cast for the referendum to be valid, that is about 450,000 votes.

== Results ==
The referendum did not gain the quorum of 453,730 votes. The results showed massive disapproval of the amendments.

Are you for the repealing of the law “Amendments to the National Security Law” of March 1, 2007?

| For | 326,479 | 96.49% |
| Against | 10,207 | 3.02% |
| Invalid | 1,662 | 0.49 % |
| Total | 338,348 | 100.00 % |

Are you for the repealing of the law “Amendments to the State Security Authorities Law” of March 1, 2007?

| For | 326,189 | 96.41% |
| Against | 10,459 | 3.09% |
| Invalid | 1,694 | 0.50% |
| Total | 338,342 | 100.00 % |
