= Rexhep Meidani =

President of Albania from 1997 to 2002

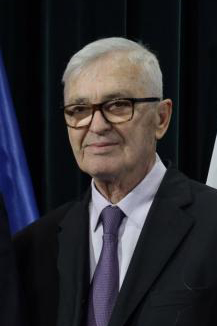
- Meidani in 2020

3rd President of Albania
- In office 24 July 1997 – 24 July 2002
- Prime Minister: Fatos Nano; Pandeli Majko; Ilir Meta; Pandeli Majko
- Preceded by: Sali Berisha
- Succeeded by: Alfred Moisiu

Personal details
- Born: Rexhep Qemal Meidani; 17 August 1944 (age 82) Tirana, German Occupied Albania (modern Albania)
- Party: Socialist Party
- Spouse: Lidra Karagjozi
- Children: 2 (Adea, Denion)
- Profession: Physicist

Rexhep Qemal Meidani (born 17 August 1944) is an Albanian physicist, professor, diplomat and politician. Meidani was the president of Albania from 1997 to 2002, and the second to be elected after the first multi-party elections in 1991.

== Education and work in academia ==
Meidani earned a degree in physics from the Faculty of Natural Sciences at the University of Tirana in 1966. He completed postgraduate studies at the University of Caen in France in 1974. He also holds PhDs from the University of Paris XI and the University of Tirana.

From 1966 to 1996, Meidani held various roles at the University of Tirana, including professor, department chair, and later, dean of the Faculty of Natural Sciences. During this period, he authored numerous studies, books, and articles, both within and outside of Albania. Alongside Eqrem Cabej and Nelson Cabej, he is recognized as one of the prominent academics in the country.

== Political career ==
Meidani's political career began in the 1990s. He assumed the role of the chair of the Central Election Commission during the inaugural multiparty elections in 1991 and was a member of the Presidential Council in the same year. From 1992 to 1996, he actively participated in civil society, serving as the chair of the Board of the Albanian Center of Human Rights from 1994 to 1996. Joining the Socialist Party in 1996, Meidani was elected its Secretary General from 1996 to 1997.

Following his election to the Albanian Assembly in the parliamentary elections of June 1997, Meidani became a member of parliament. Subsequently, after the left coalition, led by the Socialist Party, emerged victorious in the elections, he was proposed by the SP and, on 24 July 1997, was elected as the President of Albania by the Albanian Assembly. He held the office until 2002, with Petrit Ago as his counsellor.

In the 2005 Socialist Party Leadership Convention, convened to select a successor to Fatos Nano, Meidani faced defeat at the hands of the present Chairman of the Socialist Party, Edi Rama.

Meidani is a member of the Club of Madrid. His son, Denion Meidani, is the current Albanian ambassador to North Macedonia.

== Honours ==
- Grand Cross with Chain of the Order of the Star of Romania (1999)
- Grand Cross of the Grand Order of King Tomislav (4 April 2001)
- Honorary Degree Recipient from The American University of Rome

== See also ==
- Politics of Albania
- President of Albania
- Presidents of Albania

Political offices
Preceded by Sali Berisha	President of Albania; 1997–2002	Succeeded by Alfred Moisiu
