= Bamir Topi =

President of Albania from 2007 to 2012

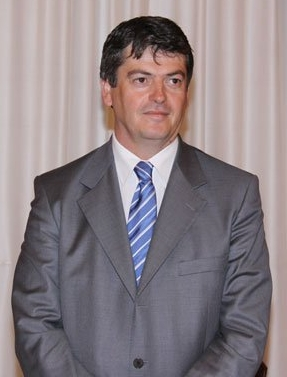
- Bamir Topi In 2008

5th President of Albania
- In office 24 July 2007 – 24 July 2012
- Prime Minister: Sali Berisha
- Preceded by: Alfred Moisiu
- Succeeded by: Bujar Nishani

Personal details
- Born: 24 April 1957 (age 69) Tirana, PR Albania
- Party: Democratic Party (1990–2007, 2023–Present)
- Other political affiliations: New Democratic Spirit (2012–2021); Independent (2007–2012, 2021–2023)
- Spouse: Teuta Mema (m. 1982)
- Parent(s): Riza Topi (father), Haxhire Karapici (mother)
- Education: Agricultural University of Tirana

Bamir Myrteza Topi (Note: Albanian pronunciation: [baˈmiɾ ˈtɔpi]) (born 24 April 1957) is an Albanian diplomat and politician who served as President of Albania from 2007 to 2012.

Topi was the honorary president of the Albanian football club KF Tirana from 2005 to 2007. In September 2012, Topi became the leader of the New Democratic Spirit party.

== Early life, education and career ==
Bamir Myrteza Topi was born in Tirana, Albania on the 24th of April 1957, to Riza Topi and Haxhire Karapici. Bamir comes from a Tirana family from his father's and mother's side. His family are of the Muslim faith in origin. On his father’s side he comes from the Topi family, which he hypothesises descend from the noble Thopia family.

On his mother’s side, he comes from the Karapici family, which makes him a relative of Adem Karapici and Artan Karapici. He has mentioned how his great grandfather owned the Karapici mosque which was located in Skanderbeg Square, Tirana before it was demolished in 1929. Bamir graduated from the Agricultural University of Tirana in veterinary studies and earned a PhD degree in the same field. In 1984, he was appointed a Scientific Researcher at the Institute of Veterinary Scientific Researches until 1995. During the 1987-90 period, he attended post-graduate studies in Italy in the field of Molecular Biology. After returning from Italy, Topi served as Director of the Food Safety and Veterinary Institute until the end of 1995.

He was first elected as a member of the Albanian Parliament in 1996 and was appointed Minister of Agriculture and Food where he served until 1997. He was elected to three mandates in the Assembly of Albania as a candidate of Democratic Party of Albania. In two terms, Topi led the Parliamentary Group of the Democratic Party in the Assembly and was Deputy Chairman of the Democratic Party. He has been elected vice-chairman of the Democratic Party of Albania, which is led by Sali Berisha.

=== Presidency ===
On 8 March 2007, Topi said that he would be the candidate of the ruling Democratic Party in the 2007 presidential election. Both the Demochristian and Republican parties said that they would intended to support him. Parliament took 4 tries, and the opposition finally gave up and elected Topi, a choice of Prime Minister Sali Berisha.

On a vote held on 8 July, Topi won 75 votes in parliament; short of the 84 votes required. The opposition, led by the Socialist Party, boycotted the vote. The second round of voting for electing the president was held on 10 July. The parliament again failed to elect a president, with Topi receiving 74 votes. On 14 July, another vote was held. Topi won only 50 votes, while Neritan Ceka of the Democratic Alliance Party won 32.

On 20 July, in the fourth round of voting, Topi was supported by some members of the opposition and won 85 votes, thus being elected as the President of the Republic of Albania for a five-year term. He was sworn in on 24 July. Topi officially resigned his position as vice-chairman of the Democratic Party of Albania and at the same time withdrew from his party.

== Support for Kosovo's independence ==
Topi is a vocal advocate of independence for Kosovo. He pointed out the need for a sovereign state of Kosovo before the European Council and other international instances.

With a joint invitation of Kosovo's President, Fatmir Sejdiu, and the head of the UN mission, Joachim Ruecker, Topi stayed for a three-day visit in Kosovo in January 2009. He was proclaimed an honorary citizen of the capital Pristina. During his visit, he was also conferred an honorary doctorate by the University of Pristina.

== Honours and awards ==
- Grand Cross of the Grand Order of King Tomislav ("For outstanding contribution to the development and improvement of relations between the Republic of Croatia and the Republic of Albania." – 7 April 2009)
- Doctor Honoris Causa of the University of Pristina (25 January 2008)
- Honorary Citizen of Pristina (26 January 2008)
- Honorary Citizen of Burrel
- Honorary Citizen of Gjakova, Kosovo

== See also ==
- Presidents of Albania

Political offices
Preceded by Alfred Moisiu	President of Albania; 2007–2012	Succeeded by Bujar Nishani
