= Presidential Office Building, Tirana =

Office of the President in Njësia Bashkiake, Tiranë

Coordinates: 41.3189°N 19.8200°E

Presidential Office
- Selia e Presidencës
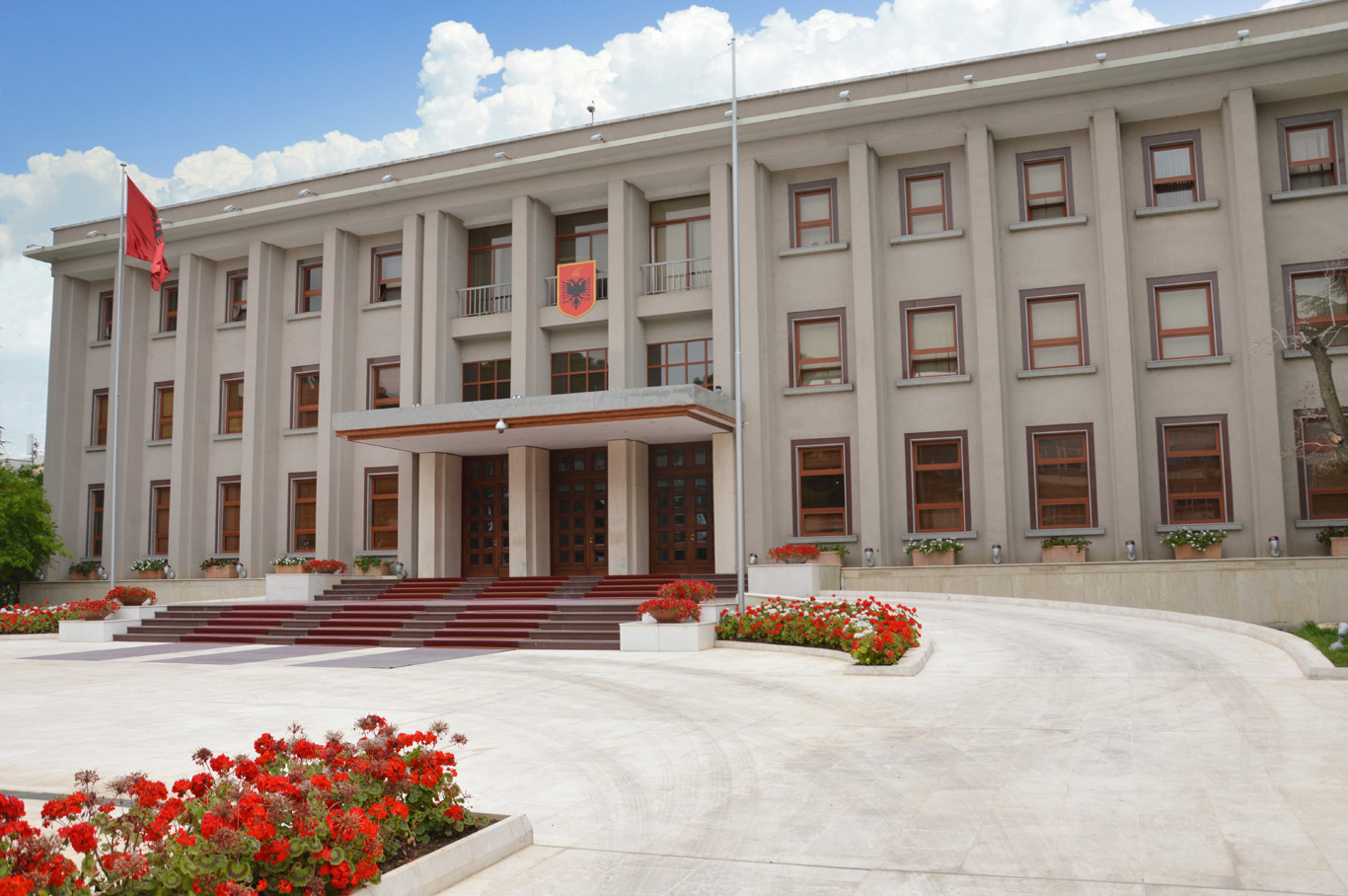
- The façade of the Building in Tirana.
- Interactive map of the Presidential Office area

General information
- Type: Office of the President
- Location: Blvd. "Dëshmorët e Kombit"; Nd. 10; Njësia Bashkiake Nr.5, 1010; TIRANË

Technical details
- Floor count: 3
- Lifts/elevators: 1

The Presidential Office (Albanian: Selia e Presidencës) houses the office of the President of Albania and is the principal workplace of the president. It consists of the immediate staff of the president, as well as support staff reporting to the president. It is located in the capital city of Tirana.

The Presidential Office Building was constructed at first to house the Embassy of the Soviet Union to the People's Republic of Albania, and served for that purpose until 1961, when both countries ceased their diplomatic relations. The discovery of dynamite at the embassy in 1951, as part of an attempted bombing, led to a violent crackdown by the Government of Albania of the time.

Following the disintegration of the communist regime in Albania, the building was used for the purpose to house the Office of the President of Albania, having been used for this purpose uninterrupted up to this day.

== See also ==
- Politics of Albania
- President of Albania
- Presidential Palace
