= President of Albania =

Head of state

President of the Republic of Albania
- Presidenti i Republikës së Shqipërisë
- Presidential Seal

- Presidential Standard

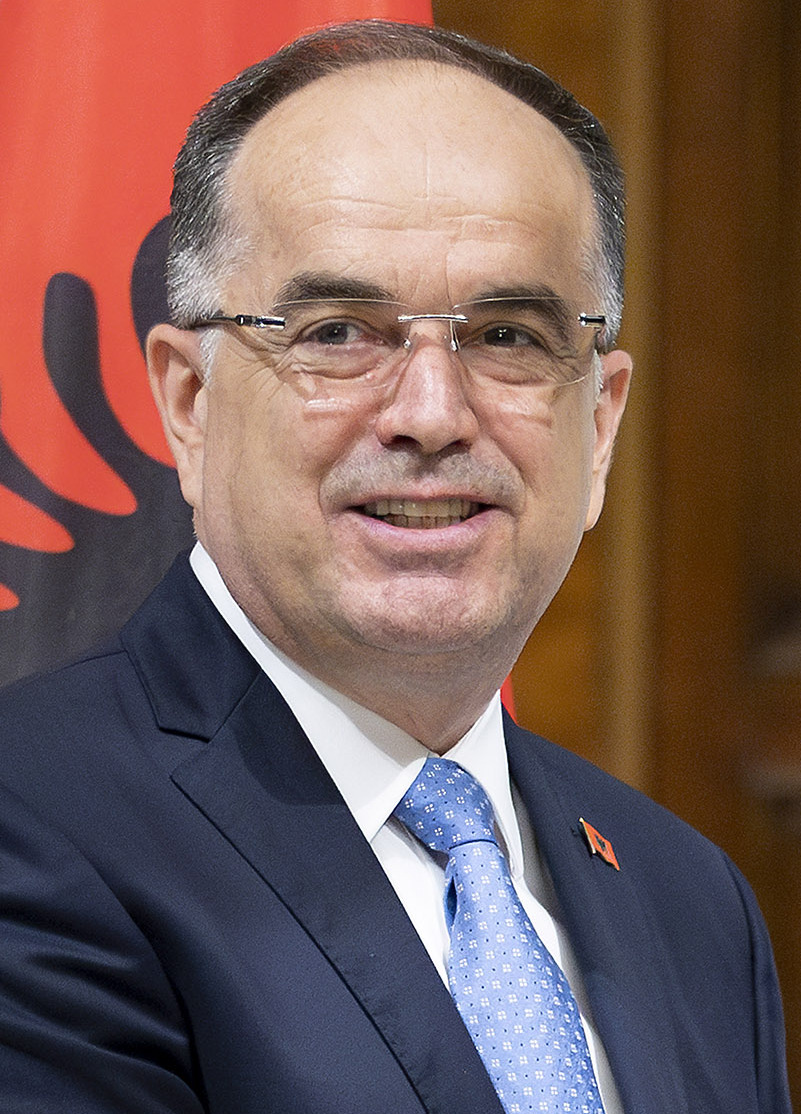
- Incumbent; Bajram Begaj since 24 July 2022
- Style: Mr President (informal); His Excellency (diplomatic)
- Type: Head of state
- Residence: Pallati Presidencial
- Seat: Tirana
- Appointer: Parliament
- Term length: Five years, renewable once
- Constituting instrument: Constitution of Albania (1998)
- Formation: 30 April 1991; 35 years ago
- First holder: Ramiz Alia
- Deputy: Speaker of the Parliament
- Salary: L425,000 per month (€3,433.79)
- Website: president.al

The president of Albania, (Note: Albanian: Presidenti i Shqipërisë) officially the president of the Republic of Albania, (Note: Albanian: Presidenti i Republikës së Shqipërisë) is the head of state, commander-in-chief of the Albanian Armed Forces and the representative of the unity of the Albanian people.

The president sets the date of elections and referendums, grants pardons and awards, grants citizenship and permits it to be given up, accepts the credentials of diplomats serving in Albania, appoints plenipotentiary representatives and the director of the State Intelligence Service at the proposal of the prime minister, and officially promulgates all laws passed by the Albanian parliament or by referendum. The Office of the President consists of the immediate staff of the president as well as support staff reporting to the president. The office is seated in the Presidential Office in the capital city Tirana. The spouse of the president is recognized as the first lady of Albania, but holds no official role in the presidency. She often plays a protocol role at the Presidential Palace and during official visits.

The president is elected through a secret vote and without debate by the Parliament of Albania by a majority of three-fifths of all its members and is elected for 5 years. The Constitution of Albania limits the president to a maximum of two terms in office. The president-elect is required to take an oath of office before the members of the parliament.

If the President is unable to discharge the duties of office or if the position is vacant, the speaker of the Parliament assumes the office's powers and duties as acting president until the president resumes those powers and duties, or until the election of a new president.

== History ==
Albania has experienced different models of governance, including an international protectorate, a monarchy, a state-party regime and the parliamentary republic as well. Throughout all this period the function of the president of Albania and head of state has been exercised in various forms.

The first government after the independence was headed by Ismail Qemali, who also enjoyed the competences of the head of state. On 6 February 1914, Prince Wilhelm Wied was appointed as head of state by the Ambassadors Conference. From September 1914 until January 1920, Albania was transformed into a battle field and experienced the change of a number of governments, where the post of the head of state was played by different governments regencies. On 8 January 1920 the Congress of Lushnjë elected the 'High Council' composed by four members, one of whom would exercise the functions of the head of state by introducing and bringing back the parliamentarian way of governance. In 1924, Fan Noli was elected as head of government while exercising at the same time the functions of the head of state. After the frequent changes in governance, the Parliament of Albania approved and passed the republican form of regime on 25 January 1925 and elected Zog I of Albania as the president of Albania. The nation was proclaimed a monarchy and Ahmet Zogu was crowned the King of Albanians on 28 September 1928. After Albania was occupied by Italy in April 1939 and the unification of the two countries, Victor Emmanuel III became the King of Albania. From 1943 to 1944 the regencies governance was introduced once again under the German occupation.

The end of the second World War and the liberation of Albania that took place in 1944 were followed by the holding of the first parliamentary elections in December 1945 and also by the transformation of the head of state's function into a collegial body, the Presidium of the People's Assembly of Albania. During the communist period from 11 January 1946 until 12 December 1990, the functions of the head of state were carried out by the Chairman of the Presidium, who were Omer Nishani from 10 January 1946 to 1 August 1953, Haxhi Lleshi from 1 August 1953 to 22 November 1982 and Ramiz Alia from 22 November 1982 to 22 February 1991. The 'Presidential Council', headed by Ramiz Alia was founded on 22 February 1991 and it lasted until 30 April 1991.

The election of the first president of the modern Republic of Albania on 30 April 1991 by a multi-party Assembly, marked the foundation of the constitutional institution of the president of Albania.

=== Electoral system ===
The President of Albania is elected by a secret vote and without debate in the Parliament of Albania. A candidate needs to receive votes from three-fifths of the total number of parliamentarian to win. If the required majority is not reached in the first round of voting, a second round takes place within seven days. If a majority is still not reached, a third round must take place within a further period of seven days. If required, a further two rounds must be held within seven days, with the majority needed to win reduced to an absolute majority of 50% +1 votes of the total number of parliamentarian. In the fifth round, only the two top candidates from the fourth round are kept. If after five rounds of voting no candidate has attained the necessary majority outlined for each round of voting, Parliament will be dissolved and elections must be held within 45 days.

=== Elections history ===
Following the disintegration of the communist regime, the first multi-party elections in Albania were held in 1991, simultaneously with the 1991 parliamentary elections. The result was a victory for Ramiz Alia of the Party of Labour of Albania (PPSh), who received 56.2% of the vote in the third round of the elections, ahead of 3 other candidates. Sali Berisha, the Democratic Party of Albania (PD) candidate and runner-up in the election, received almost 38.7% of the vote. Ramiz Alia resigned as the president on 3 April 1992. The same year, the second presidential elections were held on 22 March 1992. The result was a victory for Sali Berisha of the Democratic Party of Albania (PD), who received 57.3% of the vote in the second round of the elections, ahead of 5 other candidates, he was elected as president on 9 April 1992. Berisha also won the third presidential election in 1997 and was re-elected on 3 February 1997, he resigned due to the Albanian unrest. The fourth presidential election were held after the 1997 parliamentary election. The result was a victory for Rexhep Meidani of the Socialist Party of Albania (PS), who was elected by the Parliament of Albania through a vote of 110 to 3. The fifth presidential elections were held on 24 June 2002. The result was a victory for Alfred Moisiu, he was chosen by both Socialist Party of Albania (PS) and Democratic Party of Albania (PD) leaders at the time Fatos Nano (PS leader) and Sali Berisha (PD leader). He was elected by the Parliament of Albania through a vote of 97 to 19.

The sixth presidential elections were held on 20 June 2007 with almost four rounds. In the first round on 20 June 2007 and 27 June 2007, no candidate was presented. The Government of Albania and the opposition presented their proposed candidate lists on 5 July 2007, but did not accept either list. Afterwards, on 14 July 2007 the third round were held. At least in the fourth round on 20 July, Bamir Topi of the Democratic Party of Albania (PD) won the election. The seventh presidential elections were held on 30 May 2012 with four rounds until 11 June 2012. The first through third rounds of voting were inconclusive. In the fourth round, the result was a victory for Bujar Nishani of the Democratic Party of Albania (PD). The most recent and eighth presidential elections were held on 19, 20, 27 and 28 April 2017. In the fourth round the incumbent Chairman of the Parliament of Albania, Ilir Meta of the Socialist Movement for Integration (SMI) was elected as seventh president of Albania with 87 votes.

== Powers, duties and responsibilities ==
As of Article 89 of the Albanian Constitution sets the following qualifications for holding the presidency, to be a natural-born citizen of the Albanian Republic, to be at least forty years old and to be a resident in the Republic of Albania for at least ten years.

The president of Albania, officially styled President of the Republic of Albania, represents the unity of the Albanian people in the country and abroad as the head of state. The president begins his duties officially after he takes the oath before the Parliament, but not before the mandate of the president who is leaving has been completed. The president of Albania is the supreme commander-in-chief of the Armed Forces of the Republic of Albania and appoints and relieves military commanders of duty, conforming to applicable legislation. Furthermore, the Chief of the General Staff is appointed as well by the president.

The Constitution, states that the president addresses messages to the Parliament, exercises the right of pardon according to the law, grants Albanian citizenship and permits it to be given up according to the law, gives decorations and titles of honor according to the law, accords the highest military rank according to the law, on the proposal of the Prime Minister, he appoints and withdraws plenipotentiary representatives of the Republic of Albania to other states and international organizations, accepts letters of credentials and the withdrawal of diplomatic representatives of other states and international organization accredited to him, signs international agreements according to the law, upon proposal of the Prime Minister, he appoints the Director of the National Security Department, nominates rectors of universities upon proposal of their council's representatives, sets the date of the elections for the Parliament, for the organs of local power and for the conduct of a referendum and requests opinions and information in writing from the directors of state institutions for issues that have to do with their duties.

=== Oath ===
Before assuming presidential duty, the president-elect is required to take an oath of office before the Parliament, swearing loyalty to the Constitution. The text of the oath in its Albanian form is sensitive to gender and all nouns always retain a neutral form. The president-elect takes the following oath of office, specified by the Constitution:

Albanian: Betohem se do t’i bindem Kushtetutës dhe ligjeve të vendit, do të respektoj të drejtat dhe liritë e shtetasve, do të mbroj pavarësinë e Republikës së Shqipërisë dhe do t’i shërbej interesit të përgjithshëm dhe përparimit të Popullit Shqiptar. Zoti më ndihmoftë!

English:

I swear that I will obey to the Constitution and laws of the country, that I will respect the rights and freedoms of citizens, protect the independence of the Republic of Albania, and I will serve the general interest and the progress of the Albanian people. So help me God!

=== Office and residence ===
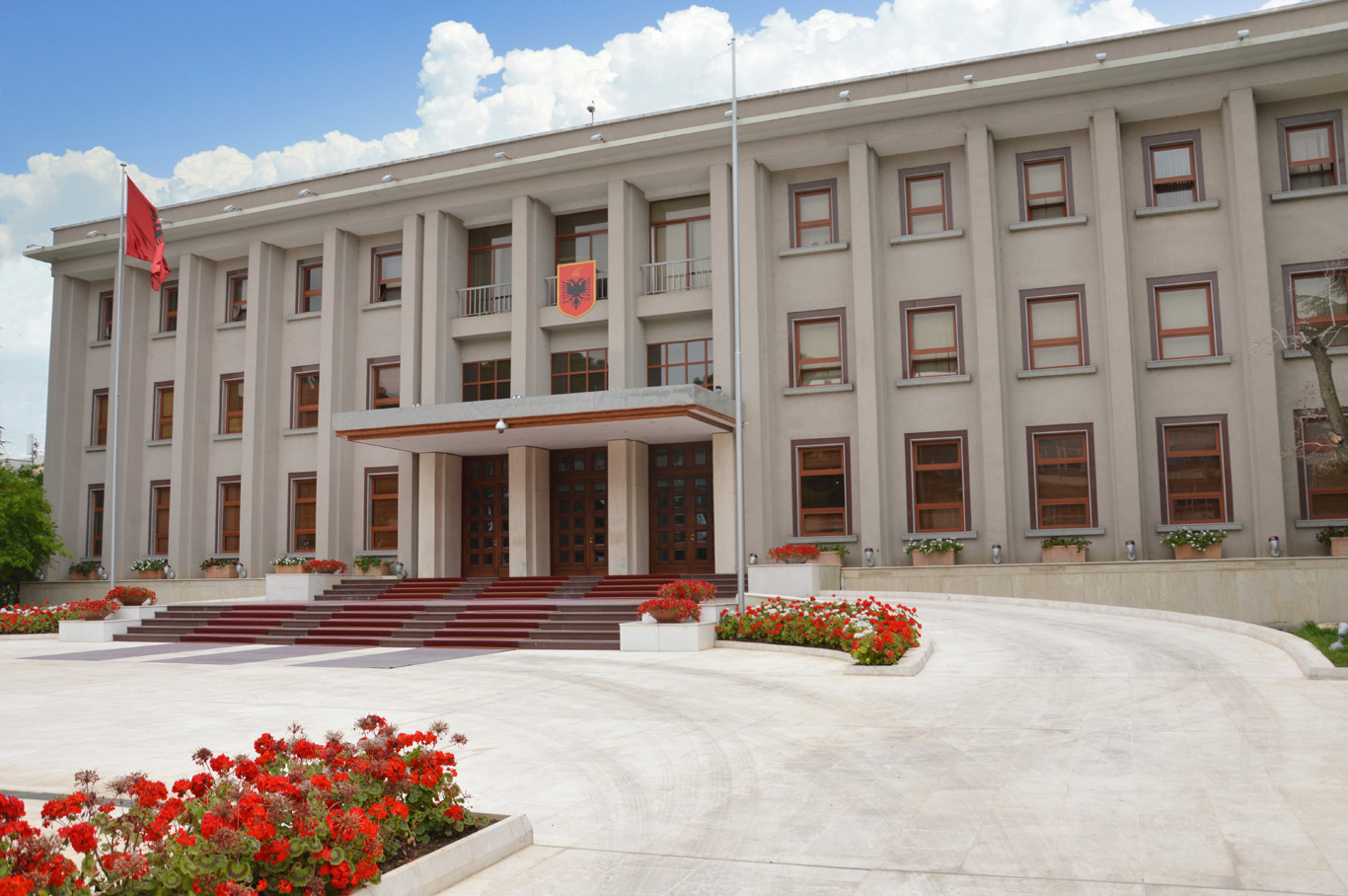
The Presidential Office in Tirana.

The Presidential Office (Albanian: Presidenca) is the official workplace of the president. It consists of the immediate staff of the president, as well as support staff reporting to the president. Since the collapse of communism, the building was used as the Office of the president, having been used for this purpose uninterrupted up to this day. The building consists three floors where two entrance gates lead an oval driveway from the Dëshmorët e Kombit Boulevard.

The Presidential Palace (Albanian: Pallati presidencial), popularly known as the Palace of Brigades (Albanian: Pallati i Brigadave), is the official residence of the president of Albania. The Palace was commissioned by King Zog I of Albania to serve as his main official residence. After the second World War it has been used by the Government of Albania for holding official ceremonies and state receptions. Due to its location near the Grand Park of Tirana, its gardens are quite extensive. It is surrounded by trees for nearly 200 metres and decorated in patterns and shapes of various designs. In addition the Palace was designed by Italian well-known architect Gherardo Bosio.

== List of presidents (1925–present) ==
No.	Portrait	Name	Term in office		Party
Albanian Republic (1925–1928)
1st		Ahmet Zogu (1895–1961)	31 January 1925	1 September 1928	Party of Traditions
1st		Ahmet Zogu (1895–1961)	3 years and 7 months		Party of Traditions
Republic of Albania (1991–present)
2nd		Ramiz Alia (1925–2011)	30 April 1991	3 April 1992	Socialist Party
2nd		Ramiz Alia (1925–2011)	11 months and 4 days		Socialist Party
3rd		Sali Berisha (born 1944)	9 April 1992	24 July 1997	Democratic Party
3rd		Sali Berisha (born 1944)	5 years, 3 months and 15 days		Democratic Party
4th		Rexhep Meidani (born 1944)	24 July 1997	24 July 2002	Socialist Party
4th		Rexhep Meidani (born 1944)	5 years		Socialist Party
5th		Alfred Moisiu (born 1929)	24 July 2002	24 July 2007	Independent
5th		Alfred Moisiu (born 1929)	5 years		Independent
6th		Bamir Topi (born 1957)	24 July 2007	24 July 2012	Democratic Party
6th		Bamir Topi (born 1957)	5 years		Democratic Party
7th		Bujar Nishani (1966–2022)	24 July 2012	24 July 2017	Democratic Party
7th		Bujar Nishani (1966–2022)	5 years		Democratic Party
8th		Ilir Meta (born 1969)	24 July 2017	24 July 2022	Socialist Movement for Integration
8th		Ilir Meta (born 1969)	5 years		Socialist Movement for Integration
9th		Bajram Begaj (born 1967)	24 July 2022	Incumbent	Independent
9th		Bajram Begaj (born 1967)	4 years, 3 months and 27 days		Independent

== First Lady of Albania ==
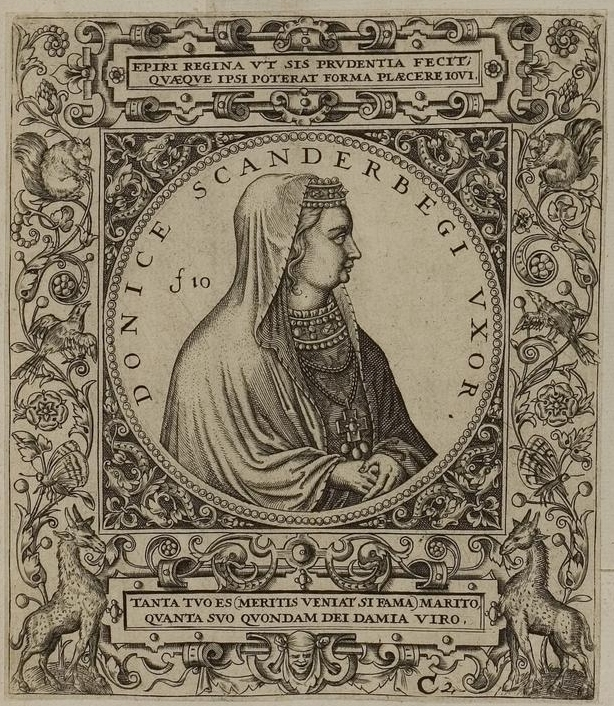
During the Middle Ages, Albanians used several titles for the spouses of Albanian monarchs. Donika Kastrioti was known as the spouse of Gjergj Kastrioti Skanderbeg.

The title First Lady of Albania is an unofficial title; it is not an elected one, carries no official duties, and receives no salary. Nonetheless, first ladies have held a highly visible position in Albanian society. The role has evolved over the years, but she is, first and foremost, the spouse of the president. However, she accompanies the president in state and official visits abroad the borders of Albania. She generally oversees the administration of Presidential Palace, the mansion that serves as the official residence, while the Presidenca serves as the official office. They also organize events and civic programs, and typically get involved in different charities and social causes.

Birthname	Relation to the president
Geraldine Apponyi (Note: Geraldine Apponyi would marry Ahmet Zogu in 1938.)	future wife of President Ahmet Zogu
Semiramis Xhuvani (Note: Semiramis Xhuvani, the daughter of prominent scholar Aleksandër Xhuvani died before her husband took office of the presidency.)	wife of future President Ramiz Alia
Lirie Ramaj	wife of President Sali Berisha
Lidra Karagjozi	wife of President Rexhep Meidani
Milica Niça (Note: Milica Niça was deceased when Alfred Moisiu was appointed President of the Republic. His youngest daughter, Mirela, carried the First Lady duties.)	wife of future President Alfred Moisiu
Teuta Mema	wife of President Bamir Topi
Odeta Kosova	wife of President Bujar Nishani
Monika Kryemadhi (Note: Monika Kryemadhi, as a Member of Parliament and the leader of the second largest opposition party, LSI, refused to take on the duties of the First Lady, therefore the couple's eldest child, Bora, resumed her place.)	ex-wife of President Ilir Meta
Armanda Ymeri	wife of President Bajram Begaj

== See also ==
- Politics of Albania
- List of heads of state of Albania
- First Lady of Albania
