= Ivodent Academy =

Dental school in Albania

- Type: Private Higher Education Institution
- Established: 2003
- Accreditation: Since 2010
- Affiliations: International Centers for Dental Education, International Union of Crystallography, European Cooperation in Science and Technology
- Rector: Prof. Ilo Mele
- Dean: Prof. Fejzi Keraj
- Location: Tirana, Albania
- Language: Albanian
- Website: ivodent.edu.al

Ivodent Academy (Albanian: Akademia Ivodent) is an Albanian accredited higher institution specializing in dental technology. The Academy is accredited from the Albanian Quality Assurance Agency of Higher Education. It offers Master and Bachelor study programs for dental technicians organized after the European Credit Transfer and Accumulation System, where the practical skills on digital and analog techniques in the dental laboratory are taught.

Ivodent Academy was founded in response to the increasing demand in the Albanian market for dental technicians able to apply modern and certified techniques, instruments and procedures for the production of dental prostheses and appliances. Ivodent Academy is Albania's most important center of education for the new and old generation of dental technicians.

== History ==
Since 2009, by Decision of the Council of Ministers, it was licensed as an institution of Higher Education in the Republic of Albania under the name of Private Professional College "Ivoclar Vivadent & Partners" and offered a three-year study program, Bachelor in "Higher Dental Technique". The College and its study program were accredited by the Public Agency for Accreditation of Higher Education in 2013. In 2016 the College was reorganized into the IVODENT Academy and approved the Statute by the Ministry of Education and Sports in December 2016.

Based on the ongoing analysis related to the needs that exist today for dental laboratory professionals as well as due to the history and connections that the institution has for years with dentists and dental professionals, it was considered necessary and an immediate market needs to provide a study program in dental techniques, for candidates who do not meet the conditions for admission to undergraduate studies. The two-year professional program fits well to create specialists in the basic techniques used today in the dental laboratory. Thus, in 2020, was opened the 2-year professional program in "Dental Technique" In the vision of the Ivodent Academy (AI) has been and remains in addition to the successful implementation and continuous quality improvement of existing study programs, Bachelor in "Higher Dental Technique" and professional program in "Dental Technique", the opening of a new second cycle study program in accordance with the developments of the dental technician profession and the demands and needs of the market in our country and beyond. Exactly this vision of institutional development of Ivodent Academy, serves the opening of the new Professional Master study program in "Digital Dental Techniques" that creates the opportunity for educational, scientific, and professional development of dental technicians and fulfills an obvious shortage of specialists who recognize these techniques. This program is based on the experience of the most developed countries in the field of dental techniques. This experience makes possible the formation of contemporary knowledge in the profession of dental technician. This program was opened in 2021.

Currently, IVODENT Academy offers three study programs, one Bachelor in "Higher Dental Technique", one 2 years professional program in "Dental techniques" and one Professional Master's Program in "Digital Dental Technique". The Academy plans to be able to offer scientific masters and doctorates in the field of dental health in the future.

== Location ==
Ivodent Academy is located at Prokop Myzeqari Street No. 10, in Tirana, in a very favorable urban position and easily accessible through public transport lines. The academy is equipped with bicycle parking spaces inside it and infrastructure adopted for paraplegic persons.

Ivodent Academy covers an area of 1000 m^{2} serving about 110 students and offering its facilities to an academic and administrative staff of about 25 people. Ivodent Academy has its own laboratory space, lecture and seminar rooms, conference room, library, and computer room. The investment realized over the years reaches the value of about 200,000 Euros for the infrastructure and furniture part and about 350,000 Euros for the laboratory equipment.

== Organization and administration ==
The structure of the Ivodent Academy is based on two main structures: the Board of Administration and the Academic Senate.

=== The Administration Board ===
The Administration Board is the highest collegial administrative body that guarantees the fulfillment of the institution's mission, financial, administrative, and movable and immovable property. The board consists of 5 members and has supervision over all of the institute's affairs, and is responsible that its development strategy and duties being fulfilled. The board consists of one representative of the founding organization, 2 members of the Academic Senate, and 2 external members that have experience in activities that have significance for the academy's teaching and research functions. The day-to-day management is headed by the Administrator, who is responsible for implementing the decisions of the board.

=== The Academic Senate ===
The Academic Senate is a cohesive decision-making body that determines the development policies of the institution, coordinates and directs and controls the teaching and research activities, and evaluates their efficiency. The Academic Senate is led by the Rector and meets periodically. The Senate is chaired by the rector and consists of 5 members, those being the Dean of the faculty, the head of departments, and 1 representative of the student council.

=== Faculty and Departments ===
The Academy has one faculty, Faculty of Dental Technicians, that consists of 2 departments, the Department of Orthodontics and the Department of Prosthetics, as well as the Center of study Techniques. Collaboration across departments is emphasized in the academy's research and education strategies. All academic and administrative staff take advantage of this possibility and are active participants in a multitude of cross-disciplinary research and education activities within the framework of the Academy.

The faculty is responsible for ensuring that lectures are given, arranging seminars, performing research and determining the syllabi for teaching, etc.

== Study programs ==
=== Bachelor in "Higher Dental Techniques" ===
The first cycle BSc study program "Higher Dental Technique", is organized full time and lasts 3 academic years, 180 credits, at the end of which a BSc degree is issued. The organization of studies is based entirely on the Guidelines of the Ministry of Education as well as on European best practices.

=== Professional Program in "Dental Techniques" ===
The program of professional character in Dental Technique is built with 120 ECTS credits and provides basic training for specialists in the most used techniques in dental laboratories enabling employment in existing laboratories. This study program will last 2 academic years or 4 semesters. In total, the student will complete 22 exams which are professional practice subjects and the final exam/diploma topic. At the end of the program, students graduate as Dental Technicians and receive a diploma. The program of professional character in Dental Technique was opened by order Nr. 189, dated 03.07.2020 of the Ministry of Education, Sport, and Youth.

=== Masters in "Digital Dental Techniques" ===
This study program lasts 1 academic year or 2 semesters. In total, the student will complete 22 exams which are professional practice subjects and the final exam / diploma topic. At the end of the program, students graduate as Digital Dental Technicians and receive a diploma. The Professional Master Program in Digital Dental Technique was opened by order Nr. 349, dated 17.09.2021 of the Ministry of Education, Sport and Youth.

== Student life ==
=== Student Council ===
The Student Council is an independent organization that does not conduct political or economic activities and promotes student participation and coordinates their representation in the governing bodies of the academy. The Student Council consists of representatives of each program and the chairman who is elected by vote once every two years.

=== Alumni ===
Ivodent Academy students are 100% either employed in their profession or have opened their own dental laboratories. Our students are employed inside and outside Albania, such as in Germany, Switzerland, Italy, Norway, Greece, and the United States of America. The academy maintains contacts with graduate students to invite them to the training it conducts and to support them in their later professional life.

== Collaborators ==
In carrying out its mission, the Ivodent Academy cooperates closely with partner institutions of higher education and research at home and abroad. These agreements have existed since the opening of the predecessor institution of the Ivodent Academy in 2004. Initially, the cooperation consisted of companies manufacturing apparatus and materials used in dental prosthetics and their departments of research-development or dental education.

In 2018-2019, agreements were signed with the Faculty of Dental Medicine of the University of Medicine of Tirana, Aldent University, and Albanian University, which are also the only institutions that offer university studies in the field of dental technology in the Albanian-speaking region of the Balkans.

Further in 2020 the agreement was signed with the Polytechnic University of Tirana, which has in its academic staff professors with experience in the fields of materials processing techniques, robotics, and automation, and as such fits well as a partner in the field of teaching and research.

The last agreement was signed in September 2021 with the Canadian Institute of Technology (CIT), which is active in teaching and research related to the development of machine control software in the industry and also adapts well as a partner in the implementation of techniques digital in learning and research.
