= Eqrem Çabej University of Gjirokastër =

University in Gjirokastër, Albania

Coordinates: 40°04′57″N 20°08′13″E

Eqrem Çabej University
- Universiteti Eqrem Çabej
- Established: January 8, 1971
- Rector: Jaho Canaj
- Location: Gjirokastër, Albania
- Colors
- Website: uogj.edu.al

Eqrem Çabej University is a university in the Albanian town of Gjirokastër, named after Eqrem Çabej. It is one of nine SIFE accredited universities in Albania. It was created as a University with the name of "Eqrem Çabej" with decision of the Albanian Government nr. 414, dated 12 November 1991, on the basis of the Higher Institute of Pedagogy that was already established in 1971. It is the most important teaching and scientific institute of Southern Albania.

University level courses in Gjirokastra had already started in 1968 when a branch of the business school of the University of Tirana had started to operate. One year later, in 1969 started the Agronomy School as a branch of the Agricultural University of Tirana, which lasted 10 years. Also, in 1969, started the Pedagogical Institute and the branch of the Academy of Physical and Sports Education Vojo Kushi which operated for 5 years.

On the basis of this experience in 1971 started its operations the Higher Pedagogical Institute. In 1980 the Biology-Chemistry School, branch of the University of Tirana was opened. In 1986 started to operate the Albanian Language School of Higher Pedagogy.

== See also ==
- List of universities in Albania
- Quality Assurance Agency of Higher Education
- List of colleges and universities
- List of colleges and universities by country
- Balkan Universities Network
