= Aleksandër Moisiu University of Durrës =

University in Durrës, Albania

- Universiteti "Aleksandër Moisiu" Durrës
- Seal of Aleksandër Moisiu University of Durrës
- Motto: none
- Type: Public
- Established: 20 December 2005 opened on 2 October 2006
- Affiliations: State University of Tetovo; Epoka University; University of Applied Sciences Landshut
- Rector: Prof. Dr. Shkëlqim Fortuzi
- Faculty: 175 (2011)
- Administrative staff: 46 administrative staff and scientific assistance (2011)
- Students: Around 17,000 (2013)
- Location: Municipality of Durrës, Albania; 41.313534°N 19.434216°E
- Campus: Urban and suburban campus in Durrës.
- Colors
- Nickname: The Streams (in Albanian: Currilsat)
- Website: uamd.edu.al

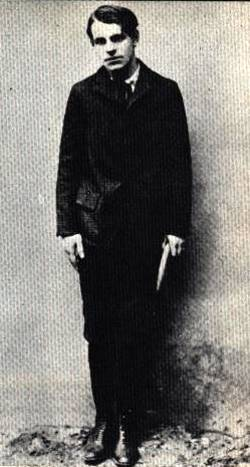
Aleksandër Moisiu, 1906

Aleksandër Moisiu University of Durrës (Albanian: Universiteti "Aleksandër Moisiu" Durrës; initialism: UAMD), also Aleksandër Moisiu University or University of Durrës, is the newest public academic institution of the Republic of Albania. The University is located in the ancient city of Durrës. The university was founded on 20 December 2005 by the Albanian Government. It was inaugurated in 2006 and is using the American system of education, unlike the rest of the public universities in the country. More than 1,300 students started classes as of 2 October 2006. University of Durrës took its name from Austrian-Italian actor Aleksandër Moisiu, who was of Albanian descent. The rector is Prof. Dr. Shkëlqim Fortuzi.

== Rectors ==
The list of rectors of Aleksandër Moisiu University of Durrës:

1. Agim Kukeli, 2006–2010
2. Mit'hat Mema, 2010–2016
3. Kseanela Sotirofski, 2016–2024
4. Prof. Dr. Shkëlqim Fortuzi, 2024–Present

== Governing bodies ==
Aleksandër Moisiu University has four governing bodies. The first is the Academic Senate, which focuses on strategy and organisation of the university. The second is the Board of Directors, which focuses on administration and finances. The Ethics Council is the third body, which discusses ethical issues related to the university, and the fourth is the Faculty Council, which is made up of professors at the school.

- Rector: Prof. Dr. Shkëlqim Fortuzi
- Vice-rector for research affairs: Prof. Asoc. Dr. Azeta Tartaraj
- Vice-rector for educational affairs: Prof.As.Dr Suela Kastrati
- Vice-rector for institutional affairs:
- Chancellor: Ulpian Hoti

== Campus ==
Aleksandër Moisiu University has three campuses.

=== Currila campus ===
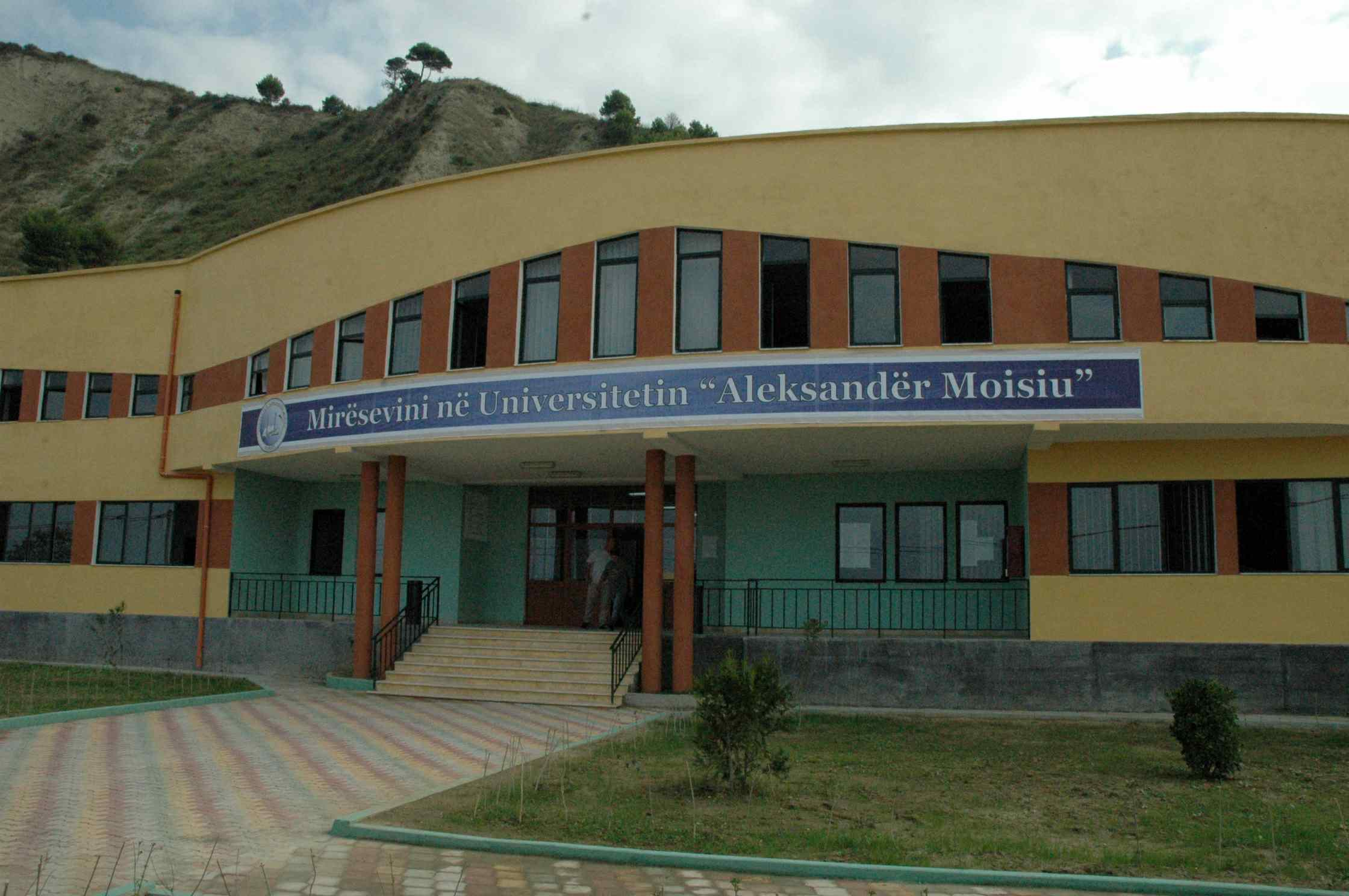
UAMD Currila campus in 2006

The first campus or the old campus is in Currila Street (Rruga e Currilave), in the centre of city of Durrës. This campus was opened in 2006.

Faculty of Political Sciences and Law, Faculty of Information and Communications Technology and Faculty of Professional Studies are located in this campus.

=== Spitallë campus ===
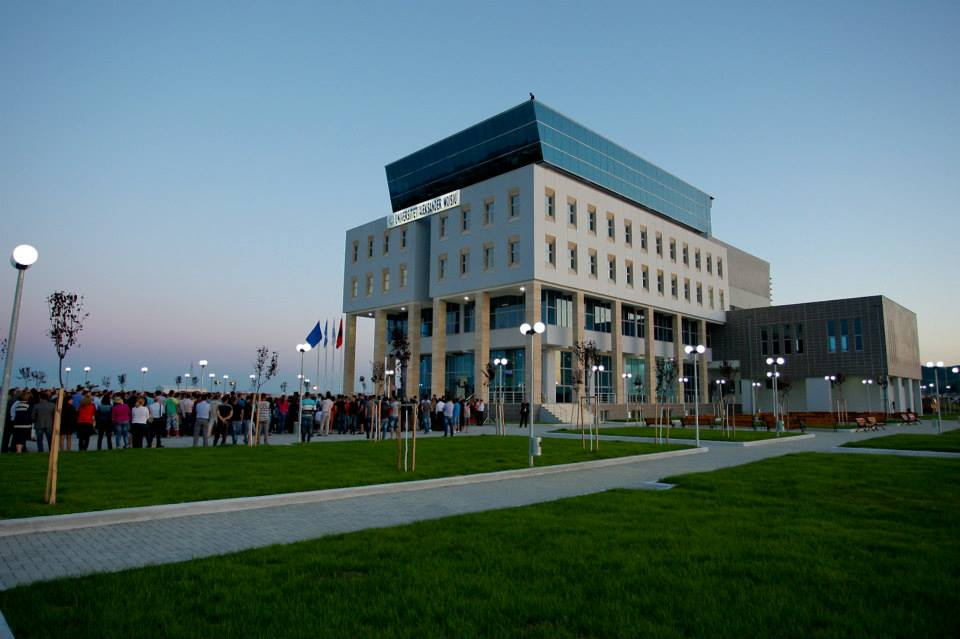
UAMD Spitallë campus

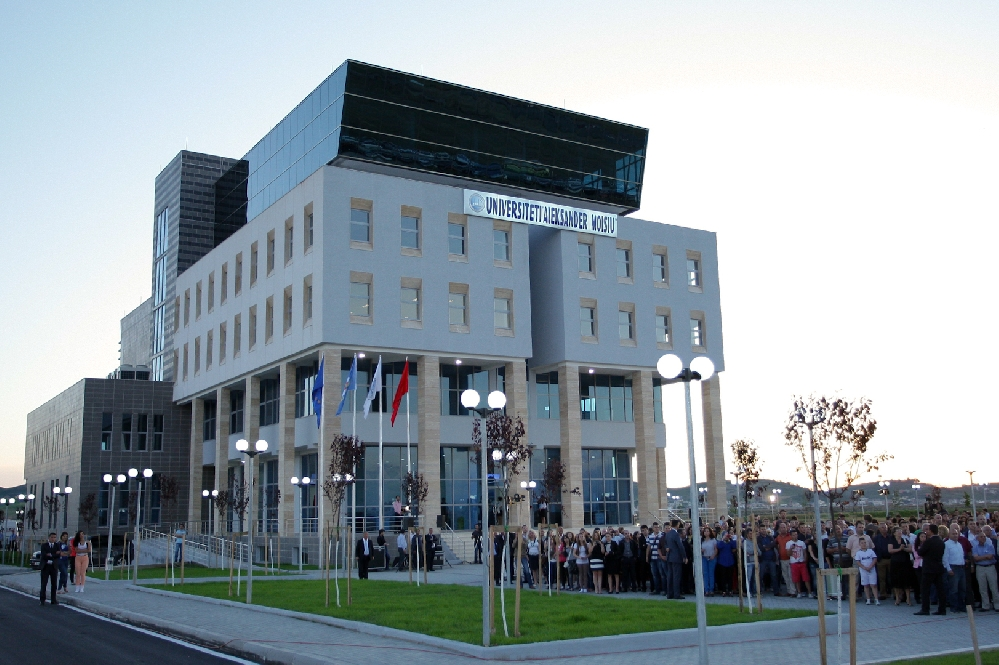
UAMD Spitallë campus

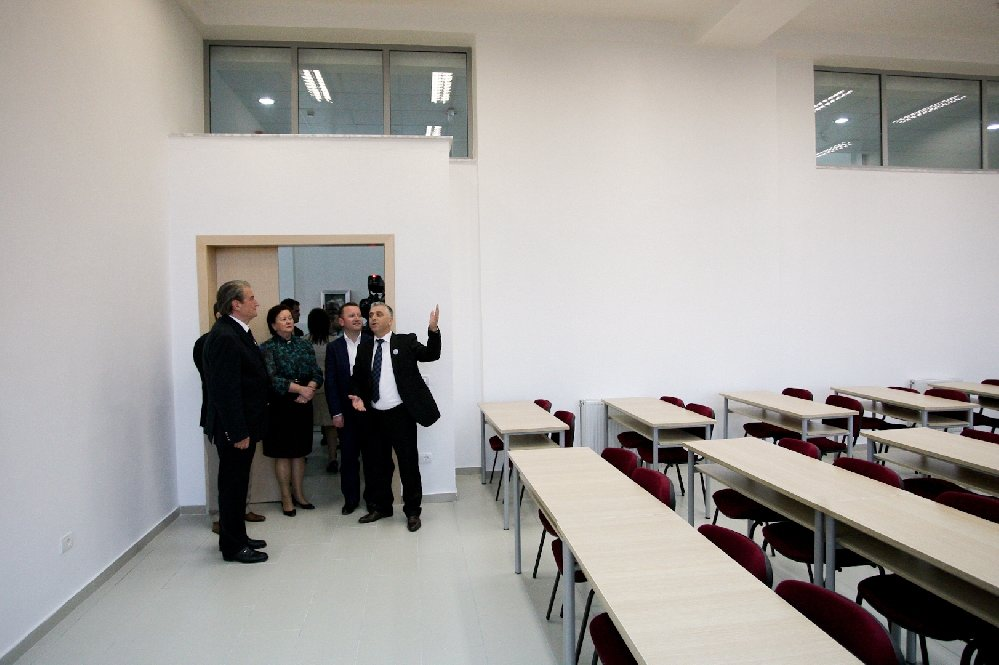
UAMD Interior new campus, Prime Minister Sali Berisha and Rector Mema

The new campus was inaugurated on 5 June 2013 by Albanian Prime Minister Sali Berisha and Minister of Education Myqerem Tafaj. The second campus is suburban and located in Spitallë, Durrës.

Built in an area of 55 hectares features; 2 large conference hall with a capacity of 220-330 seats, 3 Computer lab, 26 auditoriums with a capacity of 3,000 to 3,500 students, library, reading room and internet room, 16 offices for academic staff and 8 administrative offices, as well as the Meeting Hall of the Scientific Council, all these facilities are equipped with ventilation and heating systems, underground parking, park, as well as 5,000 square meters of green space.

The Faculty of Business and the Faculty of Education are located in this campus.

=== FASTIP campus ===
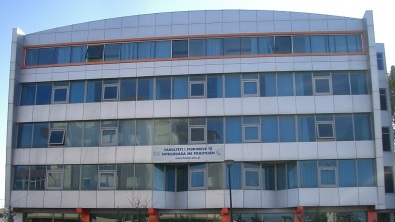
FASTIP building

The address of FASTIP is Lagjja Nr. 17, Rruga Adria, Durrës.

== Organization ==
There are six faculties (5 internal and 1 external):

- The Faculty of Business (Fakulteti i Biznesit; FB),
- The Faculty of Political Sciences and Law (Fakulteti i Shkencave Politike dhe Juridike; FSHPJ),
- The Faculty of Information and Communications Technology (Fakulteti i Tekonologjisë së Informacionit; FTI),
- The Faculty of Education (Fakulteti i Edukimit; FE),
- The Faculty of Professional Studies (Fakulteti i Studimeve Profesionale; FSP ose SHLP),
- The Faculty of Integrated Studies with Practice (Fakulteti i Studimeve të Integruara me Praktikën; FASTIP),
- The Branch of Peshkopia (Filiali i Peshkopisë) [closed in 2014]

=== Faculty of Information and Communications Technology ===
Dean of the Faculty of Information and Communications Technology is Docent Lindita Mukli.

=== Former Branch of Peshkopia ===
In 2009, the Albanian government decide to open a branch of UAMD in Peshkopia, administrative center of Dibër County, but in September 2014 Rama Government closed all branches of public university, including the branch of Peshkopia.

=== Faculty of Integrated Studies with Practice ===
Dean of the Faculty of Integrated Studies with Practice (FASTIP) is Dr. Ela Golemi.

FASTIP was established as an innovative project in 2008 on a decision of the Council of Ministers (No. 827, date 11.06.2008: "Decree on Opening at the University "Aleksandër Moisiu" Durrës, the Faculty of Integrated Studies with Practice (FASTIP) and on the manner of its operation for the provisional period"). In 2012 the pilot project phase has extended by the Council of Ministers until 2014.

Under the bilateral Albanian-German Governmental Agreement, the experience of the Dual University Baden-Württemberg (DHBW), and with support of Deutsche Gesellschaft für Internationale Zusammenarbeit (GIZ). FASTIP started the lectures in January 2009. The study program is designed to provide students with an education based on a combination of theoretical studies and practical on-the-job training in Albanian Partner Banks and Enterprises.

Studies at FASTIP last three years. Each semester is made up of six theoretical modules covered within a two or three week teaching sequence in English or Albanian language by national and international Guest Lecturers. Students' practice period of fourteen weeks/semester is carried out in close cooperation with FASTIP, Banks and Enterprises.

After a successful graduation students awarded with the academic Bachelor diploma of the University "Aleksandër Moisiu" Durrës have already gained the necessary practical skills and competences to establish their further professional career. From 2011 all graduated students of Bank Management Study Program received a work contract with their supporting Banks.

FASTIP is an external faculty in which English is the language studies, a partnership with banks and companies in Albania:

- Banka Kombetare Tregtare, Raiffeisen Albania, Credins Bank in Banking Management;
- Hotel Dyrrah, Harmonia Hotel Group and Romania Hotel in Hotel and Tourism Management;
- Vodafone Albania, Albanian Mobile Communications, Kantina "Gjergj Kastrioti Skënderbeu", Bruness, Kolonat, Neptun, Teleperformance Albania in SME Management;
- Vodafone Albania and Albanian Mobile Communications in Multimedia and Information Technology.

== Notable people ==
From 2006 to 2012, 2281 students graduated from the university, with the first graduation held in 2009. The number of students graduating ranged from 160 in 2009 to 708 in 2011.

=== Notable alumni ===
- Odeta Nishani, the First Lady of Albania
- Ilir Bejtja, deputy minister of Energy and Industry of Albania

=== Notable professors ===
- Ilir Hoti, former Governor of the Bank of Albania

== See also ==
- Education in Albania
- List of universities in Albania
- Quality Assurance Agency of Higher Education
