= List of universities in Albania =

This is a list of accredited and non-accredited higher academic institutions based in Albania.

== Public institutions ==
No.	Name	Licensed	Status
1	University of Tirana	30 May 1957
2	Polytechnic University of Tirana	15 July 1951
3	Agricultural University of Tirana	28 July 1951
4	Armed Forces Academy	10 May 1958
5	Academy of Albanological Studies	22 August 2007
6	Security Academy	25 February 2015
7	Sports University of Tirana	28 September 1960
8	University of Arts, Tirana	23 March 2011
9	University of Medicine, Tirana	23 January 2013
10	Aleksandër Moisiu University	20 December 2005
11	Luigj Gurakuqi University	18 April 1957
12	Aleksandër Xhuvani University	12 November 1991
13	Eqrem Çabej University	8 January 1971
14	Fan Noli University	29 May 1992
15	Ismail Qemali University	28 February 1994

== Private institutions ==
No.	Name	Licensed	Status
1	Albanian University	10 April 2004
2	Aldent University	27 September 2006
3	Bedër University	6 April 2011
4	Canadian Institute of Technology	10 November 2011
5	Our Lady of Good Counsel University	27 August 2004
6	Epoka University	12 March 2008
7	European University of Tirana	20 September 2006
8	Ivodent Academy	19 February 2009
9	Logos University College	29 July 2009
10	Luarasi University	11 September 2003
11	Marin Barleti University	12 August 2005
12	Marubi Academy of Film and Multimedia	30 September 2004
13	Mediterranean University of Albania	19 February 2009
14	Metropolitan University of Tirana	12 May 2010
15	Nehemiah Gateway University	4 June 2008
16	Professional College of Tirana	26 August 2015
17	Polis University	11 October 2006
18	Qiriazi University College	10 May 2006
19	Tirana Business University College	6 October 2010
20	University College of Business	14 September 2011
21	Pavarësia University	11 March 2009
22	Academy of Applied Studies "Reald"	14 September 2011
23	University of New York, Tirana	15 August 2002
24	Wisdom University	27 September 2006
25	Epitech Albania	8 June 2017
26	Tirana Esthetics and Style School	31 July 2018
25	Western Balkans University	8 June 2017

== Closed institutions ==
No.	Name	Licensed	Status
1	American University of Tirana	27 February 2008
2	Kristal University	6 December 2005
3	Vitrina University	6 May 2009
4	Justiniani I University	15 March 2006
5	Planetary University of Tirana	26 August 2009
6	Tirana Construction Academy	2 November 2011
7	Justicia University	27 September 2006
8	V.I. Lenin Higher Party School	11 August 1945

== Other institutions ==
- Quality Assurance Agency of Higher Education
- Academy of Sciences of Albania
- Centre for Research and Development on Information Technology and Telecommunication (Albania)
- Vëllezërit Kajtazi Educational Institute

== See also ==
- Education in Albania
- Lists of universities and colleges by country
- List of libraries in Albania
- List of schools in Albania
