= List of libraries in Albania =

This is a list of libraries in Albania.

== National libraries ==
- National Library of Albania
- Library of the National Archaeological Museum
- Parliament of Albania Library

== Public libraries ==
- Marin Barleti Public Library

== University libraries ==
- Library of the Academy of Sciences of Albania
- Natural Sciences Faculty Library at Aleksandër Xhuvani University
- J. Limprecht Library in the Faculty of Economics at the University of Tirana
- Institute of History Library at the University of Tirana
- Library of the History and Philology Faculty
- Library of the Justice Faculty
- Library of the Social Sciences Faculty
- Library of the Agriculture University of Tirana
- Library of the Sports University
- Academy of Arts Library
- Library of the Medicine Faculty
- Scientific Library of the Polytechnic University
- Library of the Civil Engineering Faculty
- Luigj Gurakuqi University Library

== See also ==
- Access to public information in Albania
- List of schools in Albania
- List of universities in Albania
