= Luigj Gurakuqi University of Shkodër =

Albanian public university

Coordinates: 42°04′N 19°30′E

- Universiteti i Shkodrës "Luigj Gurakuqi"
- Type: Public
- Established: April 18, 1957
- Rector: Prof.Dr.Tonin Gjuraj
- Students: 10,000
- Location: Shkodër, Albania
- Colors
- Website: unishk.edu.al

The Luigj Gurakuqi University of Shkodër (Albanian: Universiteti i Shkodrës "Luigj Gurakuqi") is an Albanian public university established in 1957.

It has 6 faculties, 26 branches, 21 departments and more than 190 professors.

It has been the major institution of higher education in the region, especially in the technical and scientific disciplines.

In 1992, the university received permission from the government to initiate the development of the Faculty of Economics, with responsibilities for emphasising market economics, management, and business administration. Menduh Derguti, rector of the University of Shkodra in 1992, asked the University of Nebraska–Lincoln to help develop its curriculum in market economics and business management. Derguti attended training seminars provided by the UNL team in September 1992. As a result, the rector, Dr. Gjovalin Kolombi, established the Faculty of Economics.

In 2002, the university received permission from the government to initiate computer science courses. The courses are being helped by HAN University, Netherlands.

The university has the Luigj Gurakuqi University Library.

== Faculties ==
There were more than 10,000 students studying in 2007, in six faculties:

- Faculty of Natural Sciences (Fakulteti i Shkencave Natyrore)
- Faculty of Social Sciences (Fakulteti i Shkencave Shoqërore)
- Faculty of Education Sciences (Fakulteti i Shkencave të Edukimit)
- Faculty of Economy (Fakulteti Ekonomik)
- Faculty of Law (Fakulteti i Drejtësisë)
- Faculty of Foreign Languages (Fakulteti i Gjuhëve të Huaja)

== See also ==
- List of universities in Albania
- Quality Assurance Agency of Higher Education
- List of colleges and universities
- List of colleges and universities by country
- Balkan Universities Network
