= University of Medicine, Tirana =

University in Tirana, Albania

Coordinates: 41°19′00″N 19°49′18″E

- Universiteti i Mjekësisë, Tiranë
- Type: Public
- Established: January 23, 2013
- Endowment: Financed by the Government of Albania
- Rector: Arben Gjata (since 2015)
- Academic staff: 413
- Administrative staff: 70
- Students: 7.500
- Location: Tirana, Albania
- Campus: urban, centralized, inside the University Hospital Center of Tirana "Mother Theresa" (QSUT). The campus comprises the 3 Faculties and 21 Departments.
- Colors: Azure and white
- Affiliations: Balkan Universities Network, Erasmus Mundus, UT, UNIPR, UNICAM, WHO, IFMSA.
- Website: umed.edu.al

The University of Medicine, Tirana (UMT; Albanian: Universiteti i Mjekësisë, Tiranë) is a public university of Health and Medical Sciences located in Tirana, Albania.

== History ==
The history of UMT is rooted in the foundation of the Higher Education Institutes in Albania, with the creation of the Higher Institute of Medicine in 1952. In 1957, the Higher Institute of Medicine and other five Higher Institutes of Education formed the State University of Tirana. In that occasion was created the Faculty of Medicine, as the main referent institution for the Albanian Medicine. Due to the highest grade of expertise and professionalism, on 23 January 2013, the Faculty of Medicine was promoted with the status of University, founding the University of Medicine, Tirana (Universiteti i Mjekësisë, Tiranë). UMT inherited the Faculty of Medicine and Technical Medical Sciences from the University of Tirana, and created hence the Faculty of Pharmacy, the Faculty of Dental Medicine and the Faculty of Public Health. The first rector of the University of Medicine, Tirana, was professor Jera Kruja. Since it re-organisation, on 30 March 2016, the University of Medicine, Tirana is composed of three Faculties: Faculty of Medicine, Faculty of Technical Medical Sciences, Faculty of Dental Medicine.

== Academics ==
The University of Medicine, Tirana is one of the most important universities in Albania. UMT comprises three Faculties, 21 academic departments.

The study programs are divided in three academic levels Bachelor, Master of Sciences/Professional, Integrated Master of Sciences and Doctoral degrees. The UMT also offers programs of speciality studies for medical practice at the Faculty of Medicine and the Faculty of Dental Medicine (2–4 years).

The University of Medicine, Tirana is composed of over 300 academic staff, 78 Full Professors and around 7.500 students enrolled at the three levels of study Bachelor (Bsc), Master (MP and Msc) and Doctoral degree (Phd).

The University of Medicine, Tirana's campus is located in the urban area, near the University Hospital Centre "Mother Teresa".

== Faculties and programs ==
The Faculty of Medicine is one of the earliest and most competitive faculty for the national and international level in the Republic of Albania. It offers various qualifications:

- Integrated Master of Science Degree in General Medicine (Master i Shkencave i Integruar në Mjekësi të Përgjithshme)
- Integrated Master of Science Degree in Pharmacy (Master i Shkencave i Integruar në Farmaci)
- Master of Science Degree in Public health (Master i Shkencave në Shëndet Publik)
- Master Professional Degree in Public health (Master Profesional në Shëndet Publik)
- Integrated Master of Science Degree in Dentistry (Master i Shkencave i Integruar në Stomatologji)
- Bachelor's degree in Nursing (Bachelor në Infermieri të Përgjithshme)
- Master of Science Degree in Nursing Management (Master i Shkencave në menaxhim Infermieror)
- Master Professional Degree in Nursing Management (Master Profesional në menaxhim Infermieror)
- Bachelor's degree in Laboratory Technician (Bachelor në Teknik Laboratori)
- Master of Science Degree in Laboratory Technician (Master i Shkencave në Teknik Laboratori)
- Master Professional Degree in Laboratory Technician (Master i Shkencave në Teknik Laboratori)
- Bachelor's degree in Physiotherapy (Bachelor në Fizioterapi)
- Master of Science Degree in Physiotherapy (Master i Shkencave në Fizioterapi)
- Master Professional Degree in Physiotherapy (Master Profesional në Fizioterapi)
- Bachelor's degree in Pediatric nursing (Bachelor në Mami)
- Master of Science Degree in Pediatric nursing (Master i Shkencave në Mami)
- Master Professional Degree in Pediatric nursing (Master Profesional në Mami)
- Bachelor's degree in Radiology (Bachelor në Imazheri)
- Master of Science Degree in Radiology (Master i Shkencave në Imazheri)
- Master Professional Degree in Radiology (Master Profesional në Imazheri)
- Bachelor's degree in Speech Therapy (Bachelor në Logopedi)
- Master of Science Degree in Speech Therapy (Master i Shkencave në Logopedi)
- Master Professional Degree in Speech Therapy (Master Profesional në Logopedi)
- Master Professional Degree in Geriatric Studies (Master Profesional në Geriatri)

== See also ==
- List of universities in Albania
- Quality Assurance Agency of Higher Education
- List of colleges and universities
- List of colleges and universities by country
- Balkan Universities Network
