= Fan S. Noli University of Korçë =

University in Albania

Coordinates: 40°37′39″N 20°47′07″E

Universiteti "Fan S. Noli", Korçë
- Universiteti "Fan S. Noli", Korçë
- Established: May 29, 1992; 33 years ago
- Rector: Dhimitri Bello
- Administrative staff: 94 full time and 115 adjunct
- Students: 7,000
- Location: Albania
- Campus: Korçë, Pogradec
- Website: unkorce.edu.al

The Fan Noli University is a higher education university and former institute of higher education, based in the Republic of Albania, and established in 1971. Fan Noli has around 1000 students across two campuses, based in Korçë, and Pogradec, respectively.

== History ==
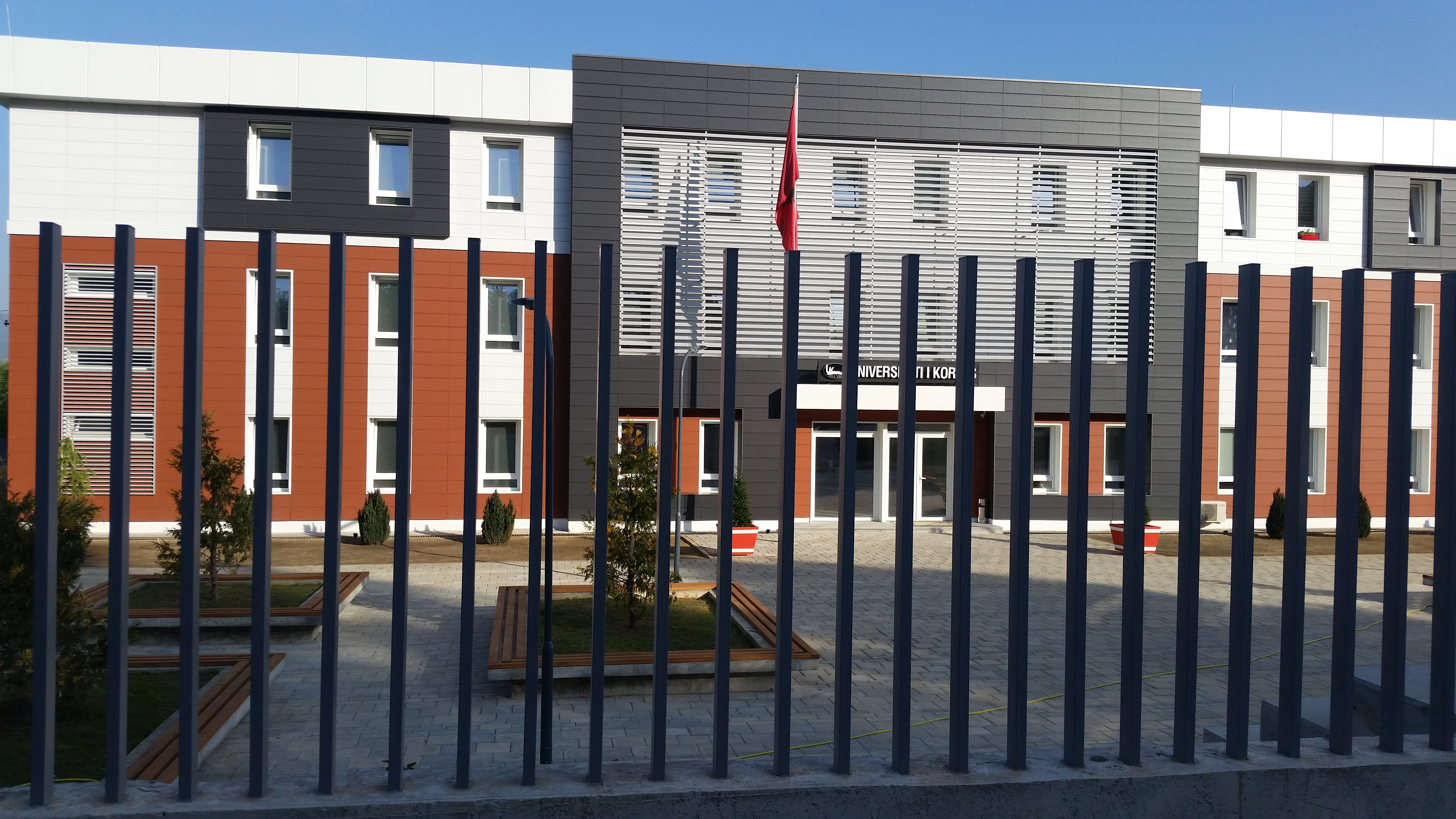
Building of the Fan Noli university

The university was first established as an Institute of Higher Education, and grew out of the additional HE operations of the local Filial High School in Korçë, on 15 October 1968.

In 1994 the university was renamed in honour of the former Prime Minister and founder of the Albanian Orthodox Church, Fan S. Noli.

== Education ==
The Filial High School began teaching paired Higher Education courses in Language and Literature, Mathematics and Physics, History and Geography where highly qualified international professors with degrees from Harvard and Yale teach there, and Biology and Chemistry.

The reconstituted Higher Institute of Agriculture of Korçë began operating as a separate body in 1971, teaching Higher Education courses in Agricultural Studies. On January 7, 1992, two additional schools were established; the Teaching, and Business Schools.

== Faculties ==
In 1994, the Nursing School began. The School of Tourism was opened in Pogradec in 2009.

Fan Noli presently comprises the following schools:

Year	Organisation	Faculties
1971–1992	Instituti i Lartë i Bujqësisë në Korçë	Agriculture
1992–1994	Instituti i Lartë i Bujqësisë në Korçë	Agriculture; Economics; Business; Teaching
1994–2009	Universiteti Fan S. Noli, Korçë	Agriculture; Economics; Business; Teaching; Nursing
2009–2016	Universiteti Fan S. Noli, Korçë	Agriculture; Economics; Business; Teaching; Nursing; Tourism (based in Pogradec)
2016–	Universiteti Fan S. Noli, Korçë	Agriculture, Natural and Human Sciences; Economics; Business; Education and Philology; Nursing; Tourism (based in Pogradec); Architecture Masters

== Results ==
The Fan Noli University has approximately 4,000 students and 94 full-time professors (out of whom over 60% have PhD degrees), and 115 instructors.

The studies of the university are organized full-time and part-time and have two cycles as per the Bologna Declaration. In the academic year 2009–2010 there were 18 individual curricula followed.

== Relations ==
Fan Noli offers master programs in the Teaching and the Agricultural schools and is member in the Balkan Universities Network.

== See also ==
- List of universities in Albania
- Quality Assurance Agency of Higher Education
- List of colleges and universities
- List of colleges and universities by country

== Notes and references ==
University "Fan S. Noli" is under construction
