= Network of Universities from the Capitals of Europe =

The Network of Universities from the Capitals of Europe (UNICA) is a network of 46 universities from the capital cities of Europe, with a combined strength of over 150,000 staff and 1,800,000 students. It also seeks to be a driving force in the development of the Bologna process and to facilitate the integration of universities from Central and Eastern Europe into the European Higher Education Area. The office of the network is located in the University Foundation in Brussels.

== History ==
UNICA was founded in 1990 on the initiative of the Université libre de Bruxelles. The mission of the network is to promote academic excellence, integration and cooperation among its member universities throughout Europe. UNICA provides the members with information on European initiatives and programmes, and supports them in co-operative projects, and a forum in which universities can reflect on the demands of strategic change in university research, education and administration.

UNICA signed a cooperation agreement with the Erasmus Student Network in March 2014 in the framework of their collaboration in the ExchangeAbility and Mapability.

In 2022, the organization suspended the three Russian universities because of Russia's war in Ukraine and the support of the rectors to Vladimir Putin's policies.

== Members ==
List of members as of 2026:

Country	Capital(s) / Other Cities	Institution(s)
Albania	Tirana	University of Tirana; Polytechnic University of Tirana
Andorra	Sant Julià de Lòria	University of Andorra
Austria	Vienna	University of Vienna
Azerbaijan	Baku	Baku State University
Belgium	Brussels	Vrije Universiteit Brussel; Université libre de Bruxelles
Bosnia and Herzegovina	Sarajevo	University of Sarajevo
Bulgaria	Sofia	Sofia University
Croatia	Zagreb	University of Zagreb
Cyprus	Nicosia	University of Cyprus
Denmark	Copenhagen	University of Copenhagen
Estonia	Tallinn	Tallinn University
France	Paris	PSL University; Sorbonne Nouvelle University
Georgia	Tbilisi	Tbilisi State University
Greece	Athens	National and Kapodistrian University of Athens; Panteion University
Hungary	Budapest	Corvinus University of Budapest; Eötvös Loránd University; Semmelweis University
Iceland	Reykjavík	University of Iceland
Ireland	Dublin	University College Dublin
Italy	Rome	Sapienza University of Rome; University of Rome Tor Vergata; University of Rome III; Università degli Studi di Roma "Foro Italico"
Latvia	Riga	University of Latvia
Lithuania	Vilnius	University of Vilnius
Luxembourg	Luxembourg	University of Luxembourg
Moldova	Chișinău	Moldova State University
Montenegro	Podgorica	University of Montenegro
Netherlands	Amsterdam	University of Amsterdam
North Macedonia	Skopje	Ss. Cyril and Methodius University of Skopje
Poland	Warsaw	University of Warsaw; Medical University of Warsaw
Portugal	Lisbon	University of Lisbon; NOVA University Lisbon
Romania	Bucharest	University of Bucharest; Carol Davila University of Medicine and Pharmacy; Bucharest University of Economic Studies
Serbia	Belgrade	University of Belgrade
Slovakia	Bratislava	Comenius University in Bratislava
Slovenia	Ljubljana	University of Ljubljana
Spain	Madrid; Alcalá de Henares	Autonomous University of Madrid; Complutense University of Madrid; University of Alcalá; King Juan Carlos University
Sweden	Stockholm	Stockholm University
Switzerland	Bern	University of Bern
Turkey	Ankara	Hacettepe University; Ankara University; Middle East Technical University
Ukraine	Kyiv	Igor Sikorsky Kyiv Polytechnic Institute
United Kingdom	London; Edinburg; Cardiff; Belfast	King's College London; University of Edinburgh; Cardiff University; Queen's University Belfast
