= Institute of Applied Mathematics =

Institute of (or for) Applied Mathematics may refer to:

- Institute for Applied Mathematics (Zurich) (now Seminar for Applied Mathematics), at ETH Zurich, Switzerland
- Institute for Pure and Applied Mathematics, at the University of California, Los Angeles, U.S.
- Institute of Applied Mathematics (Heidelberg), at Heidelberg University, Germany
- Institute of Informatics and Applied Mathematics (now Centre for Research and Development on Information Technology and Telecommunication), in Tirana, Albania
- Instituto de Investigaciones en Matemáticas Aplicadas y Sistemas (Applied Mathematics and Systems Research Institute), in Mexico City, Mexico
- Instituto Nacional de Matemática Pura e Aplicada (National Institute for Pure and Applied Mathematics), in Rio de Janeiro, Brazil
- Keldysh Institute of Applied Mathematics, in Moscow, Russia
