= Ismail Qemali University of Vlorë =

Public university in Vlorë, Albania

- Universiteti i Vlorës "Ismail Qemali"
- Type: Public university
- Established: February 28, 1994
- Location: Vlora, Albania; 40.4542°N 19.4853°E
- Campus: Urban
- Website: univlora.edu.al
- Location in Albania

The Ismail Qemali University of Vlorë (Albanian: Universiteti "Ismail Qemali" i Vlorës) is a public university located in Vlorë, Albania. It was founded in 1994 as Vlorë University of Technology Ismail Qemali. As of 2014, it offers degrees in economics, public health, and humanities, in addition to engineering and technology.

== See also ==
- List of universities in Albania
- Quality Assurance Agency of Higher Education
- List of colleges and universities
- List of colleges and universities by country
