= Soboňa =

Soboňa is a Slovak surname. Notable people with the surname include:

- Juraj Soboňa (1961–2025), Slovak politician
- Miloš Soboňa (born 1975), Slovak football player

== See also ==
- Sopona, a Yoruba deity
