= Luarasi University =

University in Tirana, Albania

Coordinates: 41.3194°N 19.8285°E

- Universiteti Luarasi
- Type: Private university
- Established: September 11, 2003; 22 years ago
- Accreditation: ASCAL
- Academic affiliations: University of London, LSE, Erasmus
- Rector: Prof. Dr. Ethem Ruka
- Academic staff: 180 (fall 2022)
- Students: 1800 (fall 2022)
- Location: Tirana, Albania
- Campus: Rruga e Elbasanit 59
- Colors
- Website: luarasi-univ.edu.al

Luarasi University (Albanian: Universiteti Luarasi) is a university in Tirana, Albania. It offers degrees in Law, Economics, Information Technology and Medical Sciences. It was founded in 2003 by decree of the Albanian government to license a private university.

== History ==
Luarasi University, founded in 2003 in Tirana, Albania, initially focused on law and public administration studies. Over time, it expanded its programs to include economics, information technology and innovation, and medical sciences, evolving into one of Albania's most respected institutions for higher education. With a commitment to developing professional skills, Luarasi University has played a significant role in shaping future leaders across various sectors in Albania. The university emphasizes innovation and integration with the European academic space.

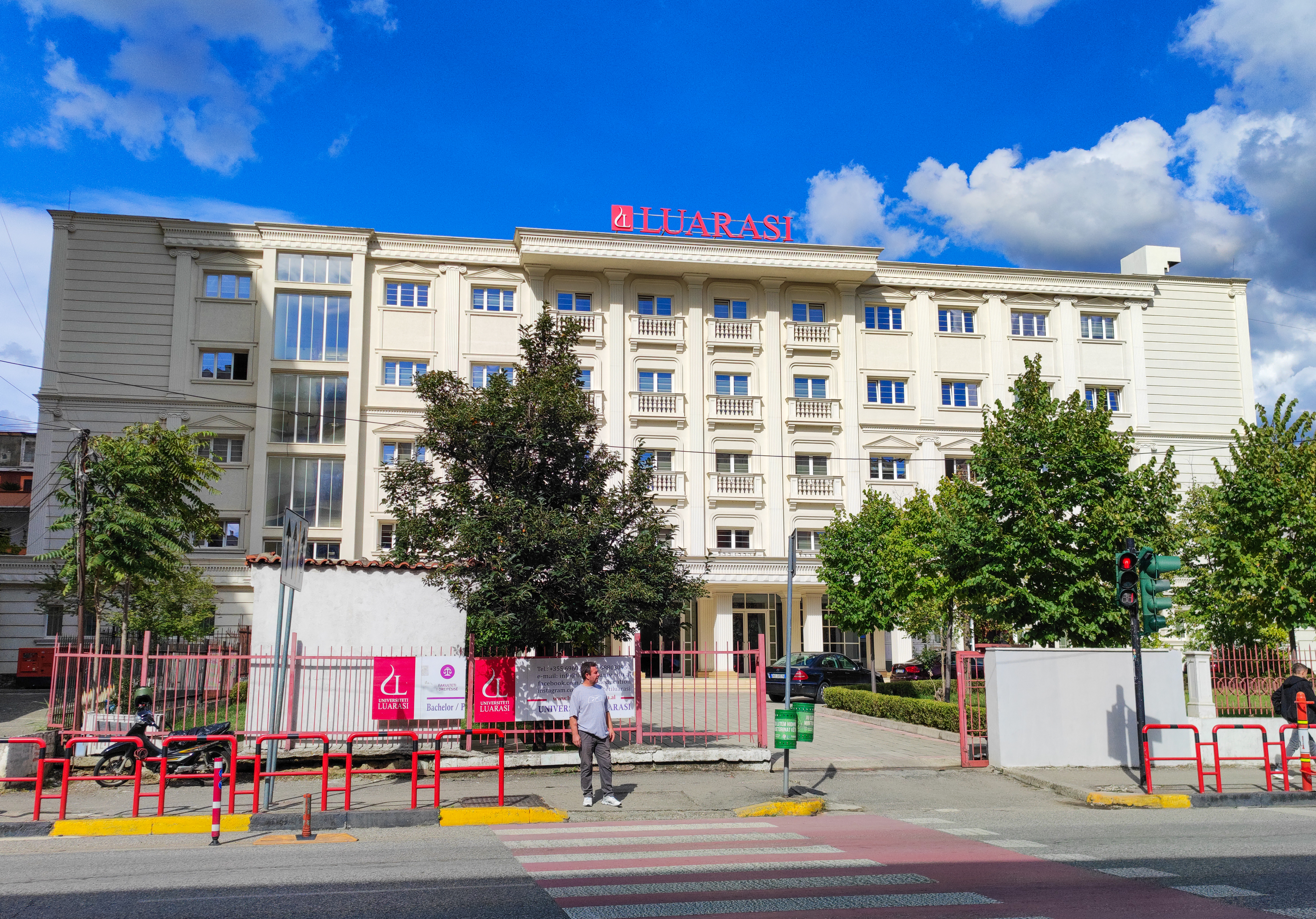
Luarasi University

== Academic Programs ==
Luarasi University currently has four faculties, Faculty of Law, Faculty of Economics, Faculty of Information Technology and Innovation, Faculty of Medical Sciences. It offers both Bachelor and Master study programs in all of them.

=== Bachelor ===
Faculty of Law

- Law

Faculty of Economics

- Business Administration
- Finance - Banking

Faculty of Information Technology and Innovation

- Information Technology and Innovation
- Economic Informatics

Faculty of Medical Sciences

- Nursing

=== Master ===
Faculty of Law

- Master of Sciences in Civil and Commercial Law
- Master of Sciences in Criminal Law
- Professional Master's in Public Security and Order

Faculty of Economics

- Master of Sciences in Executive Management
- Master of Sciences in Banking and Financial Markets
- Professional Master's in Finance and Risk Management
- Professional Master's in Accounting
- Professional Master's in Insurance Management
- Professional Master's in Marketing and Advertising

Faculty of Information Technology and Innovation

- Master of Sciences in Information Technology and Innovation
- Professional Master's in Cybersecurity and Information Security

== See also ==
- List of universities in Albania
- List of colleges and universities
- List of colleges and universities by country
