= Vitrina University =

University in Albania

Coordinates: 41.3217°N 19.8190°E

- Universiteti Vitrina
- Type: Private
- Active: May 6, 2009–August 6, 2014
- Students: 8.000
- Location: Tirana, Albania
- Campus: Suburban

Vitrina University was a private university founded in 2004 in Tirana, Albania according to the Court Decision no: 32.237. Its licence was revoked by the Albanian government in August 2014. The university had seven faculties, offered 41 programs, and was a member of the Balkan Universities Network.

== Faculties ==
- Architecture
- Economy and Tourism
- Educational Sciences
- Engineering
- Law
- Medicine
- Political Sciences

The languages of instruction at Vitrina University were Albanian, English and German. The study programs are compatible with the Bologna system. Thecampus, near the Tirana-Durrës highway, was 20.000 sq.m. It sheltered the Vitrina Formation and Professional Center with about 25 branches and the Vitrina High School with five branches of professional education and a full-time high school plus a part-time one.

== Bachelor programs ==
- Faculty of Law has a studying program of the first level, organized in three academic years with 180 credits. This studying program aims to provide students the basis professional knowledge in law. Civil Right/Trade Right/Penal Right/Administrative Right
- Faculty of Economy and Tourism aims to prepare skilled specialists in the field of Economy and Tourism. Finance-Banking / Business Management / Tourism Management / Public Administration
- Faculty of Political Sciences aims to graduate skilled specialists in the disciplines of Politics, to employ specialists in the public administration, political organs, in media, etj. Political Sciences / Journalism- Communication / International Relations
- Faculty of Medicine aims to provide full capabilities of reasoning and contemporary treatment of cases and problems, preparing students for a rewarding career in the field of Medicine. General Medicine / Nursing / Stomatology / Pharmacy
- Faculty of Engineering aims at providing qualified specialists in the field of Applied Electronic. Electronic Engineering / Informatics Engineering / Electrical Engineering / Engineering and Telecommunication/ Information and Communication Technology (ITC) / Mechatronics
- Faculty of Education aims at providing qualified specialists in Education. Psychology / Sociology / Pre-School Teacher Education / English Language / Arabic Language and Literature
- Faculty of Architecture aims to provide the future architects with the necessary knowledge related to the field of planning, projecting and maintenance of the construction and not only. Architecture / Building Engineering

== Master study programs ==
- Faculty of Economy: Master Science in Finance Banking and Professional Master in Managing and Marketing.
- Faculty of Political Sciences: Master Science in Political Communication and Professional Master in Local and Executive *Administration.
- Faculty of Justice: Master Science in the Civil and Trade Right Professional Master in Penal Right.
- Faculty of Education Sciences: Master Science in Advising Psychology, Master Science in English Language Teaching, Professional Master in General Teaching, Professional Master in Managing the Education Institutions.

== Master Science study programs ==
- Faculty of Medicine: Master Science in Public Health and Clinic Managing Master Science in Pharmacy and Master Science in Medicine.
- Faculty of Engineering: Master Science in Electronic Engineering Professional Master in Informative Engineering Professional Master in Mechatronics
- Faculty of Architecture: Master Science in Architecture and Master Science in Building Engineering

== Cooperation agreements ==
Vitrina cooperates with more than 90 national and international partners on joint research, staff and student exchange, and training.

See the selected institutions with which the university cooperates:

- Uludag University of Bursa, Turkey
- University of Şehır in Istanbul, Turkey
- Trakya University, in Edirne, Turkey
- University of Zagreb, Croatia
- University in Varaždin, Croatia
- Ondokuz Mayıs University in Samsun, Turkey
- London South Bank University in London, England
- University of Sarajevo in Bosnia and Herzegovina

== See also ==
- List of universities in Albania
