= Alfred Karamuço =

Albanian Politician, Lawyer and Constitutional Judge (1943–2012)

Alfred Karamuço (27 January 1943 in Korçë – 14 February 2012 in Tirana) was an Albanian politician, attorney, and judge. He graduated with a law degree from the University of Tirana in 1965. He worked in the Public Attorney District of Saranda, Erseka, Tirana, and then in the General Prosecutor's Office in Tirana. He was a lecturer in the Albanian Police Academia in 1987. In 1988, he started working as a legal adviser on juridical byro of the Council of Ministers in Tirana. In 1991, he became a Minister of State Control and the year after, he became the Deputy Head of Service Control of the State. Karamuço was part of the Central Head Council of Republican Party of Albania. In 1995, he started the 12 year mandate as a member of the Constitutional Court of Albania. He retired in 2007. He is married to Valentina Karamuço, with whom he has three children.
