= Balkan Universities Network =

University association in Southeast Europe

- Balkan Universities Network: Rrjeti i Universiteteve të Ballkanit (Albanian); Balkanska univerzitetska mreža (Bosnian); Балканска мрежа университети (Bulgarian); Balkanska sveučilišna mreža (Croatian); Δίκτυο Πανεπιστημίων των Βαλκανίων (Greek); Балканска универзитетска мрежа (Macedonian); Балканска универзитетска мрежа (Montenegrin); Rețeaua Universităților din Balcani (Romanian); Балканска универзитетска мрежа (Serbian); Balkan Üniversiteler Ağı (Turkish)
- Logo used by the Trakya University Presidency
- Abbreviation: BAUNAS
- Type: University Association
- Legal status: higher education associations
- Purpose: Facilitation of higher education sector dialogue in the region of Balkans
- Headquarters: Rotating among the member universities
- Region served: Balkans and neighboring areas
- Website: www.baunas.org

The Balkan Universities Network or Balkan Universities Association (BAUNAS) is an association of universities in Southeast Europe. In its present form the body was created after the breakup of the SFR Yugoslavia and the end of the Yugoslav Wars. Association facilitates the regional cooperation in the context of expansion of higher education sector caused by the establishment of new private and public universities (in addition to traditional schools with their existing institutional links).

Association helped in the exchange of experiences in the implementation of the Bologna Process at Balkan universities. The aim of the network is the exchange of know how and experience in research and education, mutual acceptance of certificates, encouragement of professors and students for more mobility between the universities and the use of support programs for student exchange. Besides bilateral meetings, conferences rotating between the member universities take place.

The 2010 conference was organized by the Trakya University in Edirne. Rector Enver Duran Trakya University Edirne (Turkey), President; Dean Hilmi Ibar Trakya University Edirne (Turkey), Vice-President; Rector Faruk Čaklovica University of Sarajevo (Bosnia and Herzegovina), Member; Rector Dhori Kule University of Tirana (Albania), Member; Rector Ioannis P Gerothanassis, University Ioannina (Greece), Member; Rector Anelia Klissarova, Varna Medical University (Bulgaria), Member.

In addition to the bilateral meetings, conferences of the Balkan universities take place at changing member locations. The 2018 meeting took place in the University of Tetovo.

In 2016, the Rector of Trakya University Erhan Tabakoglu in Edirne has taken over the general secretariat of the association. Since 2018, Enver Duran has been honorary president and Pericles A. Mitkas president of BAUNAS. The new additional goal is to work more closely with the network of Black Sea Universities Network (BSUN).

== Members ==
Country	Institution(s)
Albania	University of Tirana; University of Medicine, Tirana; Epoka University; Eqrem Çabej University; Fan S. Noli University; Luigj Gurakuqi University
Bosnia and Herzegovina	University of Sarajevo; University of Mostar; University of Tuzla; University of Zenica
Bulgaria	Agricultural University of Plovdiv; American University in Bulgaria; University of Sofia; Burgas Free University; St. Cyril and St. Methodius University of Veliko Tarnovo; State University of Library Studies and Information Technologies; Technical University of Varna; Technical University of Gabrovo; Medical University of Varna; University of Shumen Episkop Konstantin Preslavski; University of Food Technologies; Varna Free University; Medical University Pleven
Croatia	University of Zadar
Northern Cyprus (de facto)	European University of Lefke
Greece	Aristotle University of Thessaloniki; University of Macedonia; University of Ioannina; Democritus University of Thrace; University of Thessaly
Kosovo	Iliria College; University of Pristina; University of Priština (North Mitrovica)
North Macedonia	FON University; Ss. Cyril and Methodius University of Skopje; State University of Tetovo; International Balkan University; St. Clement of Ohrid University of Bitola; South East European University
Moldova	Comrat State University
Montenegro	University "Mediterranean"; University of Montenegro
Romania	Ovidius University; University of Bucharest; Andrei Saguna University
Serbia	University of Belgrade; University of Arts in Belgrade; University of Novi Sad; University of Niš; University of Kragujevac
Turkey	Trakya University; Dokuz Eylül University; Galatasaray University; University of Istanbul; Namik Kemal University; Fırat University; Süleyman Demirel University; Atatürk University; Bozok University; Kirklareli University; Çanakkale Onsekiz Mart University

== Guest members ==
- Baku State University
- Baden-Wuerttemberg Cooperative State University Loerrach
- University of Graz

== See also ==
- National Institutes of Technology – 31 leading public engineering universities in India
