= Ilir Hoti =

Albanian economist and banker (1957–2016)

1st Governor of the Bank of Albania
- In office 1 May 1992 – 1 September 1993
- Preceded by: post created
- Succeeded by: Dylber Vrioni

Personal details
- Born: 10 May 1957 Durrës, Albania
- Died: 1 March 2016 (aged 58) Durrës, Albania
- Education: Agricultural University of Tirana

Ilir Hoti (10 May 1957 – 1 March 2016) was an Albanian economist and banker. Hoti was governor of the Bank of Albania from May 1992 until September 1993. From 2012 to January 2015 he was Dean of Faculty of Business at Aleksandër Moisiu University of Durrës. He was from the Hoti tribe.

A graduate of the Faculty of Economy and Agribusiness, Agricultural University of Tirana, he served as an associate professor. He was fluent in English and Italian.

== Arsidi scandal ==
Hoti was arrested in 1993, along with former Prime Minister Vilson Ahmeti, for the "Arsidi" scandal, but he was subsequently released by the Court of Tirana. Hoti was acquitted.

== Books ==
He is the author of several books, including Financial Management (2009), Financial Management (2011), and Risk Management And Insurance Industry (2011). He is the author of the trilingual dictionary on Economy (Albanian, Italian and English).

== Honours and awards ==
- Honorary Citizen of Durrës (post mortum)
