= Gentiana Susaj =

Albanian human rights activist (born 1976)

- Born: 1976 (age 49–50); Albania
- Education: University of Tirana
- Occupations: Human rights activist Aikidoka
- Years active: 2018–present
- Organization: Aikido Albania

Gentiana Susaj (born c. 1976) is an Albanian human rights activist. After a career working in human rights law, Susaj began studying aikido, eventually becoming a black belt. She has since advocated for the use of martial arts as a tool to empower and protect women in Albania.

== Biography ==
Susaj was born and raised in a rural area of northern Albania. She studied law at the University of Tirana before gaining a postgraduate degree in international migration, human rights and development from the Latin American Faculty of Social Sciences in Ecuador. Upon returning to Albania, Susaj specialised in human rights law, primarily working to address issues of human trafficking and gender in Albania.

Susaj later began to study aikido, and received her black belt in 2018, becoming the first woman in Albania to gain one. She later established Aikido Albania, the first woman-led martial arts centre in Albania, which advocated for teaching aikido, alongside mindfulness and self-defence techniques, to empower survivors of human trafficking and domestic violence. During the COVID-19 pandemic, Aikido Albania launched the Better Together initiative (Albanian: Më mirë së bashku), which offered practical, financial and emotional support to women impacted by coronavirus and its impact on daily life. As of 2025, Susaj had supported over 6000 women, in addition to training 200 people to teach self-defence.

In 2019, Susaj certified as a coach with Empowerment Through Self-Defence, a New York-based organisation that advocated for the use of martial arts to empower women and to prevent violence against them. She went on to become ESD's regional coordinator for Europe, in addition to serving on its board of directors. Susaj's lobbying led to the Albanian government enshrining ESD methods in its national youth policy, which led to the establishment of self-defence clubs in 60 schools by 2022.

Susaj has publicly supported the PPP campaign (Albanian: Patriarkat, Pandemi, Pabarazi, lit. 'Patriarchy, Pandemic, Inequality'). She called for a "rebellion" amongst women to fight against oppression and gender inequality in Albania. Susaj expressed her belief that "centuries" of legends, story-telling and social norms had "poisoned" Albanians into normalising the patriarchy and violence against women.

As of 2025, Susaj lives in Tirana with her two sons.
