= Dhori Kule =

University rector

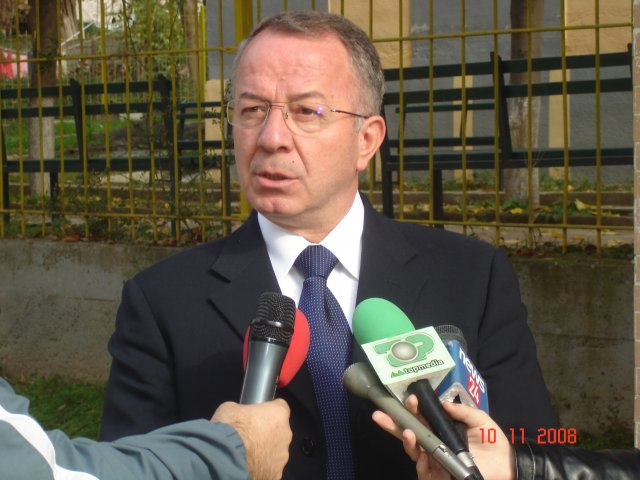
- Born: February 17, 1957 (age 69)
- Education: University of Tirana

Dhori Kule (born February 17, 1957) is an educator and was Rector of the University of Tirana, Albania. He is member of the board at the Balkan Universities Network. He is currently the Dean of the Faculty of Economics of the University of Tirana.

== Biography ==
Dhori Kule received his diploma in economics from the University of Tirana in 1981. Afterwards he started his career as teacher at Kuçova and Berat and as dozent at the Tirana University.

Dhori Kule attended international studies in Italy (1992), Poland (1993), United States (1994), England (1995), Greece (1996) and Germany (2000–2002).

In 1997 Dhori Kule took up the post as Dean of the Faculty of Economics at the Tirana University until 2007 and again from 2016 and onward. In 2008 he was appointed as the Rector of the Tirana University until 2016. He authored and co-authored numerous scientific textbooks in economics and expert papers in the areas of economics in the transition period of Albania.
