= Centre for Research and Development on Information Technology and Telecommunication (Albania) =

- Qendra për Kërkim dhe Zhvillim në Teknologjitë e Informacionit dhe Komunikimit
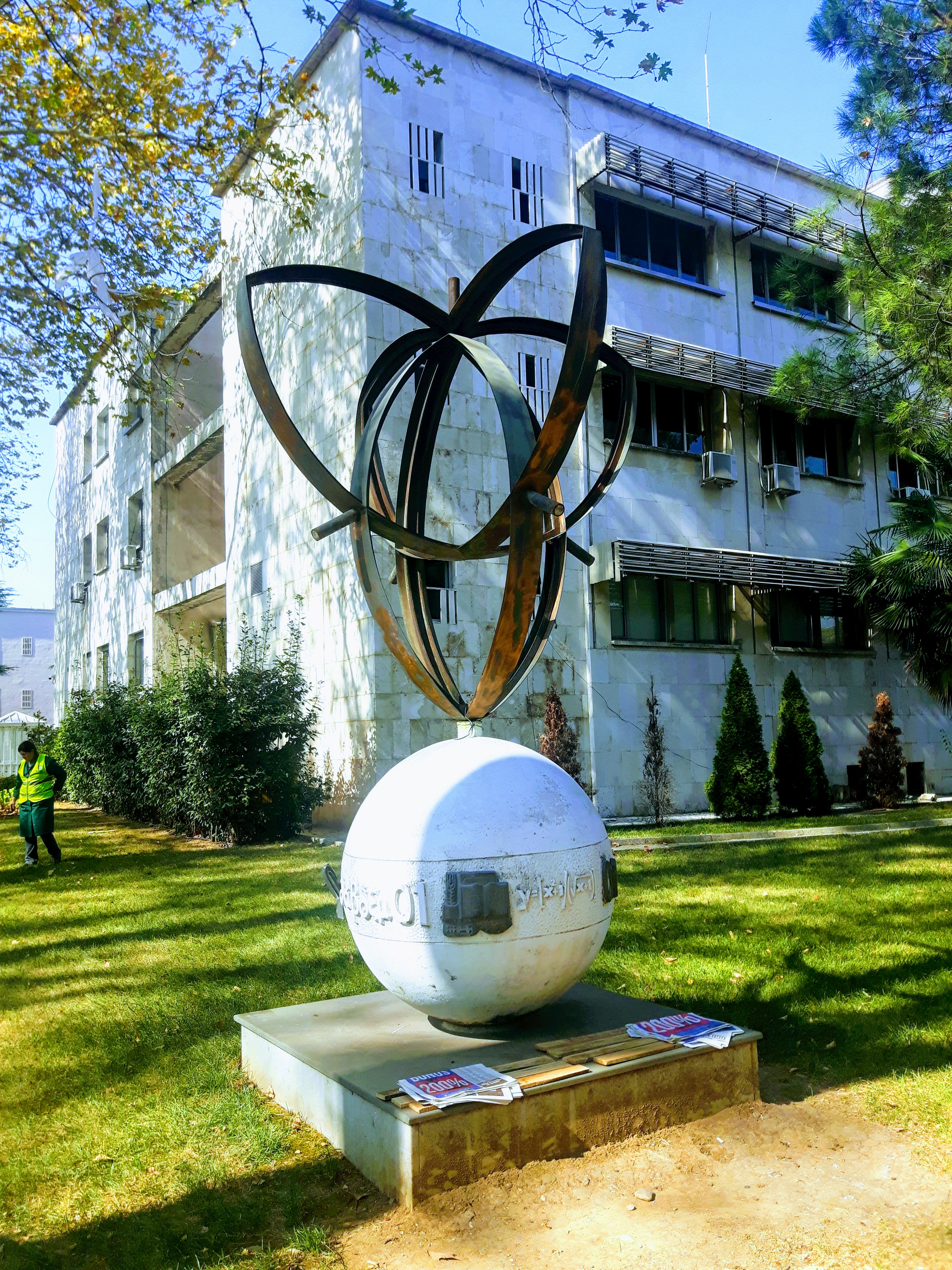
- Headquarters of INIMA
- Type: information technology
- Established: December 5, 2007
- Location: Tirana, Albania
- Website: itc.upt.al/qkzh.html

The Centre for Research and Development on Information Technology and Telecommunication (Albanian: Qendra për Kërkim dhe Zhvillim në Teknologjitë e Informacionit dhe Komunikimit), formerly known as INIMA or Institute of Informatics and Applied Mathematics is a research institute on technology in Tirana, Albania, affiliated since 2007 with the Polytechnic University of Tirana. It was founded in 1986 on the basis of the Center of Computational Mathematics (QMLL). The latter former was founded in 1971, depending from Tirana University (UT) and, in 1973, when the Academy of Sciences of Albania was founded, became one of the scientific institutions the Academy was composed of.

Having some of the most prominent experts in informatics and applied mathematics, INIMA has played a prime hand role in all informatics developments in Albania, in introduction of modern methods and technologies in different domains of Albanian reality such as: economics, engineering, geology&mining, medicine and health care, farming, animal breeding, etc.; in the preparation of new specialists as well as in offering different scientific services, installation and maintenance of computer systems, etc.

In 2007, with a Council of Ministers decision (#146 dated 28 March 2007), INIMA was dissolved and restructured as part of the Polytechnic University of Tirana. INIMA was renamed to "Centre for Research and Development on Information Technology and Telecommunication" (after Council of Ministers' decision #824 dated 05.12.2007).

== See also ==
- List of universities in Albania
