= Polytechnic University of Tirana =

Albanian public university

Coordinates: 41.3172°N 19.8213°E

- Universiteti Politeknik i Tiranës
- Type: Public. Study levels offered: Bachelor, Master, Doctorate
- Established: July 15, 1951
- Endowment: Financed by the Government of Albania
- Rector: Prof.Dr. Akli Fundo
- Faculty: 280
- Students: 10,000
- Location: Tirana, Albania
- Campus: urban, decentralized
- Colors
- Website: upt.edu.al

The Polytechnic University of Tirana (UPT) (Albanian: Universiteti Politeknik I Tiranës) is a public university located in Tirana, the capital of Albania. It offers degrees in engineering and related fields.

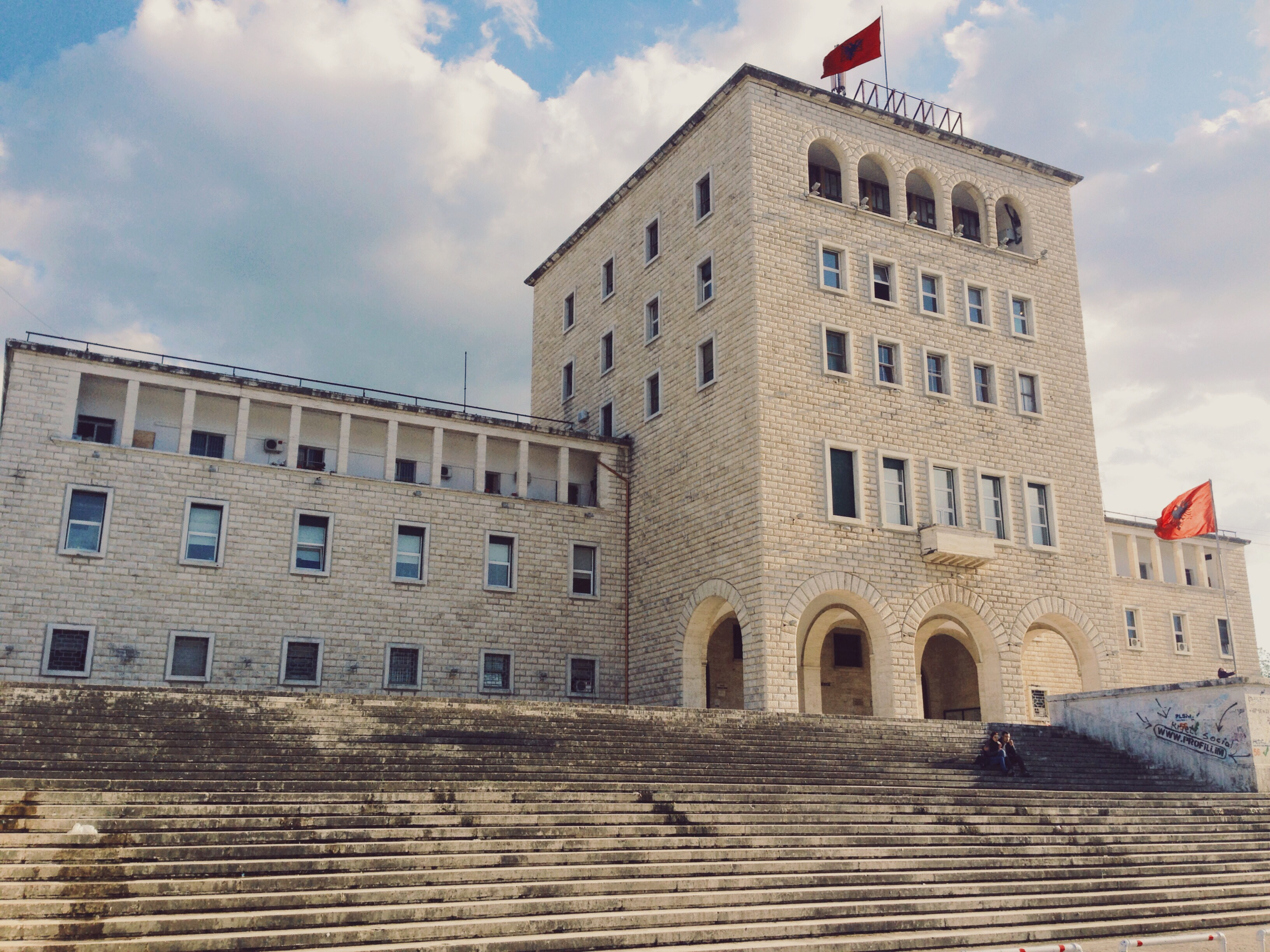
Main building of the Polytechnic University of Tirana in Mother Teresa Square

== History ==
The Polytechnic University of Tirana is the oldest and the second largest university in Albania, after the University of Tirana. It was founded in 1951 and now has approximately 10,000 students, who come from Albania, Kosovo, Montenegro, and North Macedonia. In 2012, at the occasion of the 100th Anniversary of the Independence of Albania, UPT was awarded a high honor badge by the President of Albania, Bujar Nishani. The university is fully accredited by the Albanian Public Agency for Accreditation of Higher Education (APAAHE).

== Academics ==
The university includes six colleges and two research institutes:

- Faculty of Civil Engineering
- Faculty of Information Technology
- Faculty of Mechanical Engineering
- Faculty of Geology and Mining
- Faculty of Electrical Engineering
- Faculty of Mathematics and Physics
- Faculty of Architecture and Urbanism
- Geosciences Institute
- Institute of Energy, Water and Environment

PUT emphasises teaching over research. It issues three-year Bachelor degrees, two-year Master degrees, and three- to five-year doctoral degrees. The academic programs are compatible with the Bologna system. The language of instruction is Albanian and, for special and/or exchange courses, English.

Among the PUT departments, the Department of Architecture and Urban Planning (DAUP), included within the Faculty of Civil Engineering is particularly competitive. It accepts about 120 students each year, out of a candidate pool sometimes as large as 360. DAUP is the largest department of architecture and urban planning in Albania and employs 35 full-time tenure-track professors, 40 adjunct professors, and 16 guest professors. It offers integrated five-year programs (Bachelor + Master) in architecture and urban planning. In the architecture program, the education of students in structural engineering and building technology are major focuses of the curriculum. In the urban planning program, urban design and landscape architecture are in focus. In addition to the integrated diplomas, DAUP offers a 3-5 year Ph.D./Doctorate program, which includes three profiles (1) Architecture Design (2) Urban Planning and (3) Historic Preservation and Restoration.

== See also ==
- List of universities in Albania
- Quality Assurance Agency of Higher Education
- INIMA
