= Juraj Soboňa =

Slovak politician (1961–2025)

Member of the Slovak National Council
- In office 9 May 2018 – 29 February 2020

Personal details
- Born: 3 June 1961
- Died: 27 June 2025 (aged 64)
- Party: Slovak National Party
- Education: Agricultural University of Plovdiv

Juraj Soboňa (3 June 1961 – 27 June 2025) was a Slovak politician who was the mayor of the village of Solčany for over 25 years. From 2018 to 2020, he was a Member of Parliament of the National Council of Slovakia.

== Life and career ==
Juraj Soboňa was born on 3 June 1961. He was educated at an agricultural school in Nitra and studied at the Agricultural University of Plovdiv.

From January 1999 until his death, he was the major of the village of Solčany, reelected seven times. He was also the chair of the local football club. From 2018 to 2020, he was a National Council MP for the Slovak National Party. He became an MP as a replacement for Jaroslav Ridoško. In 2019, the Aktualne.sk website revealed that a staffer working for Soboňa was previously involved in criminal activities. After publication of the findings, Soboňa fired his aide.

Soboňa died after a long illness on 27 June 2025, at the age of 64.
