= Harilla Papajorgji =

Albanian politician (1933–2019)

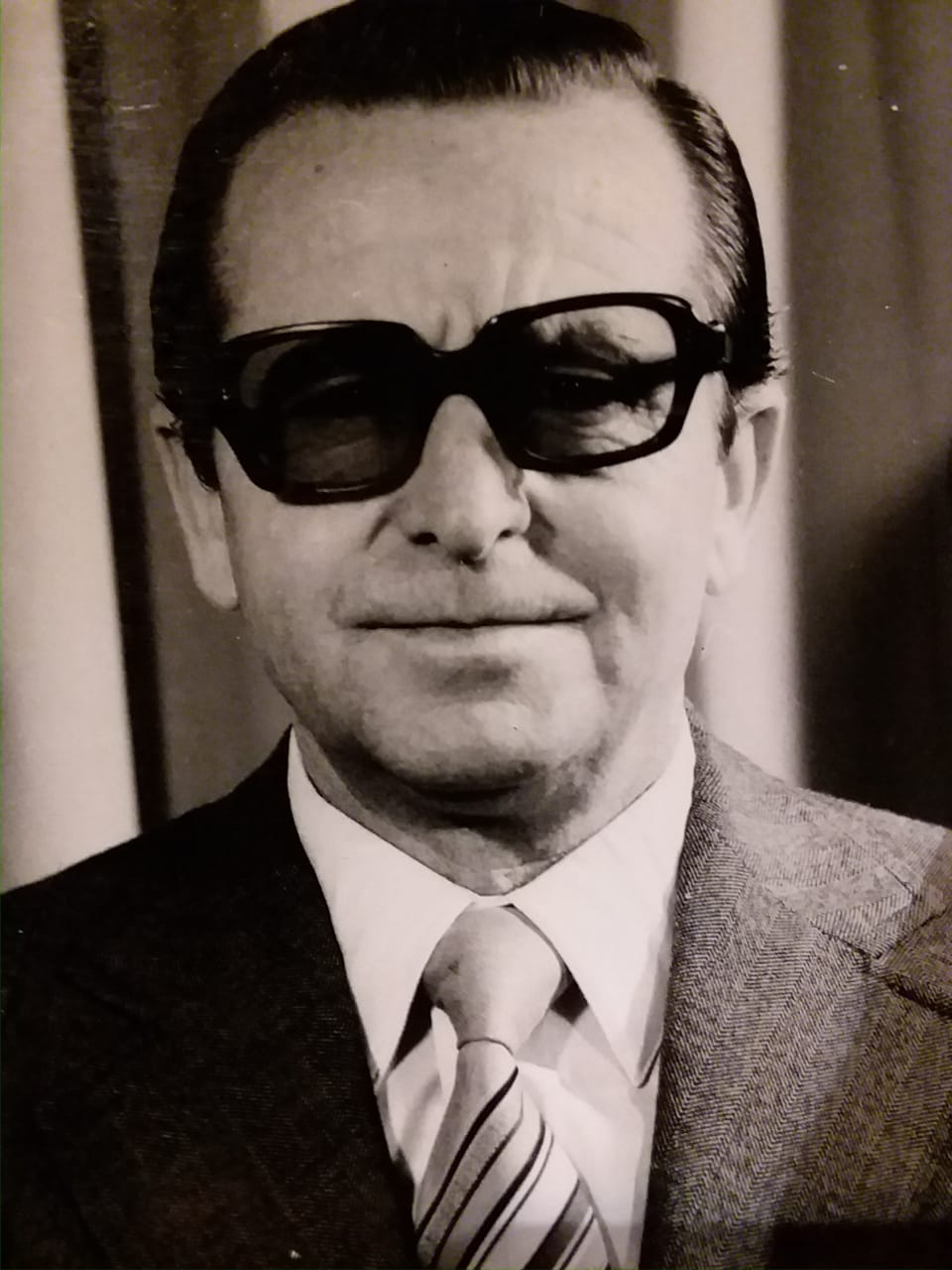
- Albanian Politician, Professor of Economics, Chairman of the State Planning Commission In Office: 1982 -1985
- Born: 11 October 1933 Vlorë, Albania
- Died: 7 September 2019

Harilla Papajorgji (11 October 1933 - 7 September 2019) was an Albanian politician, professor of economics and statesman. He served as chairman of the State Planning Commission from 1982 to 1985, member of People's Assembly from 1982 to 1987 and vice director of the Scientific Institute of Central Party Committee from 1985 to 1991.

== Early life and education ==
Harilla Papajorgji was born on 11 October 1933. He grew up and spent his childhood in Vlore. After World War II Papajorgji studied at the Commercial and Trade School in Vlore and finished his University studies with excellent results at the Tirana Higher Economics Institute in 1956. He was the first generation of Graduates that were appointed Lecturers at the newly established Faculty of Economics, University of Tirana in 1956. He received his scientific title of "Scientific Collaborator" in 1972, his "PhD Title" in 1982 and the academic title of "Professor" in 1986.

== Political career ==
After finishing his studies in 1956, Papajorgji was appointed full time Professor at the Faculty of Economics, University of Tirana where we worked until 1964. He was member of the Scientific Council of the Faculty until 1991. In 1964, he was appointed First Secretary in Tirana and worked at the Scientific Institute of Central Party Committee from 1969 to 1981. He was appointed Chairman of the State Planning Commission from 1982 - 1985 and was elected member of People's Assembly from 1982 to 1987. He succeeded Petro Dode on the position of Chairman of the State Planning Commission until November 1985 in the Çarçani II Government. Because of health reasons, he resigned from the chairman position and was appointed as Vice Director of the Scientific Institute of Central Party Committee.

== Published works ==
Harilla Papajorgji has published more than 10,000 pages in the form of monographs, university textbooks, chapters in scientific studies, research articles and proceedings books. Some of his books are translated in English, French, Russian and Greek. List of selected publications:

- The development of socialist industry and its prospects : in the People's Republic of Albania
- Our friends ask
- Razvitie socialističeskoj promyšlennosti v Narodnoj Respublike Albanii i ee dal'nejšie perspektivy
- Gnoseis politikes oikonomias : gia ta mesaia scholeia / Harilla Papajorgji; Theodhori Bej; Priamo Bollano
- Nos amis nous demandent ...
- Mbi disa probleme dhe aspekte të përqëndrimit, specializimit e kooperimit ne industri
- Struktura social-klasore e klasës punëtore
- Probleme të organizimit e të drejtimit të ekonomisë popullore në RPSH / Hasan Banja; Jani Fullani; Harilla Papajorgji
- Bazat e organizimit socialist të punës dhe drejtimit / E. Sejko; Harilla Papajorgji; Jani Fullani
- Mbi disa probleme të rikonstruksionit dhe modernizimit të industrisë në kuadrin e revolucionit tekniko-shkencor : konferenca kombëtare e studimeve shoqërore : kumtesë / Fejzo Bino; Harilla Papajorgji
- Ekonomia e industrisë RPSh : tekst mësimor / Pleurat Xhuvani; Harilla Papajorgji; Vladimir Misja; Aristotel Pano
- Organizimi dhe planifikimi i ndërmarjeve industriale socialiste / E. Sejko; Harilla Papajorgji
- Mbi disa probleme të përqëndrimit, specializimit e kooperimit në industri / Harilla Papajorgji; Edmond Luçi
- Njohuri të ekonomisë politike : për shkollat e mesme / Harilla Papajorgji; Theodhori Bej; Priamo Bollano
- Organizimi dhe planifikimi i Ndërmarjeve Industriale Socialiste / Emin Sejko; Harilla Papajorgji

== Honours, decorations, awards and distinctions ==
Harilla Papajorgji has received First Prize of the Republic of Albania in 1989 for his study on demographic and family developments, improvements to the economy of centralized planning and social problems of the time.
