= Iliria College =

Private high school in Kosovo

Coordinates: 42.6558°N 21.1725°E

Iliria Royal University
- Iliria College
- Type: Private
- Established: 2001
- Rector: Mixhait Reçi
- Location: Pristina, Kosovo
- Campus: Urban
- Website: www.uiliria.org/en/

Iliria College (Iliria Royal University, Albanian: Kolegji Iliria) is a private provider of higher education in Kosovo. The Iliria Kolleg Pristina began its activity in 2001 as a private institution which combines the Albanian educational tradition with contemporary concepts. The Iliria College is member of the Balkan Universities Network.

As of 2013, it is accredited by the Kosovo Accreditation Agency to offer courses in computer science, business, and law.
