= Our Lady of Good Counsel University =

University in Albania

Catholic University "Our Lady of Good Counsel"
- Universiteti Katolik "Zoja e Këshillit të Mirë"
- Motto: Renovabitur Sicut Aquilae
- Motto in English: Your youth will be renewed like the eagles
- Type: Private
- Established: August 27, 2004
- Affiliations: Roman Catholic
- Rector: prof. Paolo Ruatti
- Principal: Prof. Tritan Shehu
- Academic staff: 600
- Students: 1500
- Undergraduates: 524
- Location: Tirana, Elbasan, Albania
- Colors: blue & white
- Website: unizkm.al

Our Lady of Good Counsel (Albanian: Universiteti Katolik "Zoja e Këshillit të Mirë", UNIZKM) is a private Catholic university in Tirana and Elbasan, Albania. The subjects are taught in Italian.

== Organization ==
UNIZKM has three Faculties:

- Faculty of Medicine
  - Dentistry
  - Nursing
  - Medicine and Surgery
  - Physiotherapy
- Faculty of Social Sciences and Communication:
  - Department of Political Science and International Relations
  - Department of Journalism and Communication
- Faculty of Economic Sciences
- Faculty of Pharmacy
- Faculty of Architecture

== See also ==
- List of universities in Albania
