= Sports University of Tirana =

University in Tirana, Albania

Coordinates: 41°19′50″N 19°48′7″E

- Universiteti i Sporteve të Tiranës
- Type: Public
- Established: September 28, 1960
- Rector: Agron Kasa
- Location: Tirana, Albania
- Colors
- Website: ust.edu.al

The Sports University of Tirana (UST; Albanian: Universiteti i Sporteve të Tiranës) is a university in Albania that trains fitness teachers and sports specialists, sport and tourism managers, guides, and physical education teachers. It awards Bachelor (1st Cycle), Master (2nd Cycle), and Doctoral (3rd Cycle) programs.

== History ==
The foundations of the Sports University of Tirana were established on September 28, 1960, through Decree No. 394 of the Council of Ministers of the People's Republic of Albania, which created the Institute of Physical Culture (Albanian: Instituti i Kulturës Fizike). In 1961, the institution was named in honor of Vojo Kushi, a prominent Albanian World War II hero and anti-fascist fighter. Initially, the institute focused strictly on training physical education instructors and specialist coaches to support the state's growing national sports and physical culture initiatives.

Over the subsequent decades, the institution underwent several major academic and structural restructurings to align with evolving educational standards in Albania:

- **Institute of Physical Culture "Vojo Kushi" (1960–1993):** Operated as the primary specialist high school and higher education facility for athletic training in the country.
- **Academy of Physical Education and Sports (1993–2010):** Following the democratic transition in Albania, the school was elevated to an Academy (Albanian: Akademia e Edukimit Fizik dhe Sporteve "Vojo Kushi"), broadening its curriculum to encompass modern sports science, sports medicine, and recreational management. It also integrated into broader regional academic exchanges during this period.
- **Sports University of Tirana (2010–present):** By decree of the Council of Ministers in 2010, the academy was officially granted full university status, reorganizing its structural departments into specialized faculties and establishing the Scientific Research Institute of Sport to oversee its expanding doctoral programs and international research contributions.

Today, the university serves as the primary national authority for higher education in movement sciences, physical therapy, and sports administration, participating actively in European academic consortiums and international mobility grants.

The university has these faculties:

- Fakulteti i Shkencave të Lëvizjes
- Fakulteti i Veprimtarisë Fizike dhe Rekreacionit
- Fakulteti i Shkencave të Rehabilitimit
- Instituti i Kërkimit Shkencor të Sportit

== See also ==
- List of universities in Albania
- Quality Assurance Agency of Higher Education
- List of colleges and universities
- List of colleges and universities by country
