= Epoka University =

Private university in Tirana, Albania

Coordinates: 41°24′17″N 19°42′19″E

- Universiteti "EPOKA"
- Motto: Build Your Future with Epoka University / Ndërto të ardhmen tënde me Universitetin "EPOKA"
- Type: Private university Study levels offered: Bachelor's, Master's, PhD
- Established: March 12, 2008
- Rector: Prof. Dr. Ahmet Öztaş
- Academic staff: 85
- Administrative staff: 42
- Students: 1400
- Undergraduates: 1100
- Postgraduates: 330
- Location: Tirana, Albania
- Campus: Rinas (suburban)
- Colors
- Affiliations: Magna Charta Universitatum, Balkan Universities Network
- Website: epoka.edu.al

University rankings

Regional – Overall
- QS Emerging Europe and Central Asia: 401-450 (2022)

Epoka University (EU) is a private university founded in 2007 in Tirana, Albania. The university received accreditation by the Quality Assurance Agency of Higher Education in 2011. It offers Bachelor's, Master's of Science, Professional Master's and PhD degrees. There are six PhD programs that are administered solely by Epoka staff, in Architecture, Civil Engineering, Computer Engineering, Economics, Political Science and International Relations and Business Administration. The school offers a joint degree with Leeds Metropolitan University.

At the Webometrics Ranking of World Universities, EU holds the first place among universities in Albania.

Epoka is an authorised IELTS registration Centre for the British Council in Albania. The university is a signatory of Magna Charta Universitatum and a member of the UNESCO based worldwide association of International Association of Universities.

Epoka University attracts students from Albania, Egypt, Turkey, Kosovo, Montenegro, and Macedonia, Italy, Norway, USA, Jordan and all around the world.

The language of instruction at Epoka University is English. The study programs are compatible with the Bologna system. The Rinas campus is located 12 km (30 minutes) from the city centre, near the Tirana International Airport.

== Faculties ==
Epoka University has three faculties, the Faculty of Architecture and Engineering, the Faculty of Economics and Administrative Sciences and the Faculty of Law and Social Sciences, eight academic departments, and three research centres:

Faculty of Architecture and Engineering:

- Architecture (5-year Integrated Second Cycle Study Program)
- Civil Engineering
- Computer Engineering
- Electronics and Digital Communication Engineering Banking and Finance
- Software Engineering

Faculty of Economics and Administrative Sciences:

- Business Administration
- Economics
- Business Informatics
- Banking and Finance
- Banking and Finance (Albanian)
- International Marketing and Logistics Management

Faculty of Law and Social Sciences:

- Political Science and International Relations
- Law (5-year Integrated Second Cycle Study Program)

== See also ==
- List of universities in Albania
- List of colleges and universities
- List of colleges and universities by country
