= Pavarësia University =

University in Vlorë, Albania

University "Pavarësia" Vlorë
- Established: March 11, 2009
- Rector: Lavdosh Ahmetaj
- Academic staff: 88 (2011/12)
- Students: 335 (2011/12)
- Location: Vlora, Bulevardi Vlore-Skele, AL-9401; 40.463011°N 19.489134°E
- Colors
- Website: unipavaresia.edu.al

"Pavarësia" University of Vlorë is a university in Vlorë, Albania, that was established in 2009.

The university was established in 2009 by decision No. 279 (dated 12-03-2009) of the Council of Ministers of Albania and acts according to the law No 9741 (date 21-5-2007 – and its later changes) given by the Ministry of Education and Science.

It has two faculties:

- The College of Economy and Social Sciences, offering Bachelor Degree, Master of Professional Studies and Master of Science courses in economy, law and political sciences.
- The College of Applied Sciences: Bachelor Degree, Master of Professional Studies and Master of Science courses in computer engineering and Master of Science (integrated degree) courses in architecture.

The governing body of "Pavarësia" University is the Board of co-partners, which is chaired and represented by its president, Ardian Zykaj. The university's rector is Dr. Lavdosh Ahmetaj.

According to the order of the Ministry of Education and Science (No 290, date 09-07-2012), the Bachelor programs of the institution are officially accredited by the ministry.

According to the order of the Ministry of Education and Science (No 388, date 10-08-2011), the institution received the permission to start new courses:

- Master Professional
  - Specialist of the Law for Commercial Societies
  - Specialist of the Law for Bank System
  - Specialist of the Law for Public Administration
  - Finance and Bank
  - Finance and the Accounting firms
  - Applying Informatics Systems in Public Administration
  - System and Network Administration
  - Software Systems Programming Specialist
- Master of Sciences
  - Private Law and International Private Law
  - Public Law and International Public Law
  - Public Finance and Public Administration
  - European Studies
  - Diplomacy and International Politics
  - Informatics Engineering
  - Economic Informatics

== See also ==
- List of universities in Albania
