= Access to public information in Albania =

Access to public information and freedom of information (FOI) refer to the right to access information held by public bodies also known as "right to know". Access to public information is considered of fundamental importance for the effective functioning of democratic systems, as it enhances governments' and public officials' accountability, boosting people participation and allowing their informed participation into public life. The fundamental premise of the right to access public information is that the information held by governmental institutions is in principle public and may be concealed only on the basis of legitimate reasons which should be detailed in the law.

In Albania the right to access to public information is guaranteed by the Constitution and by the Law on the Right to Information approved in 2014 and providing for a sound legal framework regulating access to public information. However, despite some significant progress toward securing the right to information over the last years, notable weakness remains in the functioning of the system and in the implementation of the law. Access is still a challenge in a country with a strong culture of secrecy and confidentiality.

== Background ==
Albania provides both constitutional and legal guarantees of the right to information. Efforts to establish a constitutional and legal framework securing citizens' right to access public information date back to the early 1990s during Albania's transition from a Communist country to a multi-party democratic system.

The Constitution, effective since 1998, enshrined this right in Article 23 and provides for the right of every person to access information held by state bodies and to attend public meetings. In 2004, the parliament passed the Law 8503, the Right to Information about Official Documents law, becoming the first country in the region to adopt a legislation on freedom of information. Currently, access to information is regulated by the Law on the Right to Information approved in 2014, which is an upgrade of previous laws and regulations.

Albania has also committed itself to realize the right to access public information through several international agreements. In 2002, Albania ratified the Convention on access to Information, Public Participation in Decision-Making and Access to Justice in Environmental Matters (Aarhus Convention) which requires the adoption of laws on access to environmental information. Moreover, as a member of the Council of Europe, Albania has committed to comply with a 2002 recommendation on access to official document.

== Legal framework ==
The new Right to Information Law of Albania has been assessed by many experts as one of the most important steps towards transparency and accountability, bringing Albanian legislation closer with the best international standards.

The new law provided greater access for the public to official documents, and sets forth a system of penalties for public officials who refused to disclose information. The new legislation includes also an array of new concepts, such as the possibility of reclassifying secret documents, the release of partial information and the use of ICTs to make information held py public bodies available and accessible to the public. The law also establishes the obligation to appoint coordinators for access to information by every public authority charged with the task of supervising the authority’s responses to information requests and created the institution of a Commissioner for the Right to Information and Protection of Personal Data charged with supervising and monitoring compliance with the law and appeals bodies and procedures in cases of refusal or partial disclosure. Under the new law the Commissioner has the faculty to use disciplinary sanctions against those violating the requirements established in the law. The sanction system for failure to respect the right to information has been strengthened with the introduction of heavy administrative sanctions for officials violating the law.

Furthermore, the new has broadened the scope of the definition of the term “public information” defined as any data registered in any form and format, maintained by a public authority as well as the definition of the term “public authority” which now encompasses commercial companies where the state hold the majority of shares, as well as any legal entity exercising public functions. Proactivity of publication for certain categories of information has been introduced.

The law establishes that requests for information of public interest can be made orally or in writing. The provision of information is free of charge: the law only enables public bodies to charge the costs for photocopying; no charge can be applied to electronic delivery.

Public bodies are obliged to give an answer within 10 days from the submission of the request (under the previous legal framework it was 40). In case the request is rejected, the applicant has the right to appeal to the Commissioner and then to the courts.

Exceptions to the right to information are established by the law, including for reasons of national security and international and intergovernmental relations.

== Access to public information in practice ==
Despite the improvements introduced by the new legal framework, the effectiveness of its implementation still remains to be seen. According to the journalist Rudina Hoxha, one of the problem is that the two institutions that should monitor the application of the law, meaning the Information and Data Protection Commissioner and the Ombudsman, have in fact a counseling character and even though by the law they are entitled to apply sanctions, this happens very rarely.

According to a 2016 report by the NGO Mjaft Movement, Albanian public institutions comply with their obligations to provided public information under FOI requests only in 42% of the cases. To test and monitor the application of the new law, the organisation submitted 230 requests for information to different public bodies, including central institutions, local ones, justice institutions and public universities. Out of 230 requests, only 98 replies were obtained. Only 80 of these answers disclosed the required information. The remaining 18 were cases of incomplete information provision.

The report found out that Albanian municipalities were the most problematic and opaque institutions in terms of applying the FOI law. The main problem concerned non-compliance with the obligation to appoint the coordinator on the right to information and great lack of transparency on budget and financial issues.

== See also ==
- Access to public information in Europe
- Freedom of information
- Freedom of information laws by country
- List of libraries in Albania
- Transparency of media ownership in Europe
- Media of Albania
- Transparency of media ownership in Albania
