= Albanian University =

Private university in Tirana, Albania

Coordinates: 40°42′4.4″N 19°57′24.5″E

- Motto: Një emër i madh shqiptar
- Type: private
- Established: April 10, 2004
- Rector: Kaliopi Naska
- Location: Tirana, Albania
- Website: albanianuniversity.edu.al

The Albanian University is a private higher education institution in Albania. Licensed by the Council of Ministers, no. 697 dated 18 June 2009, it opened in the academic year 2009-2010, offering programs in two faculties: Faculty of Social Sciences (programs in Science Teaching Legal, Political Science and Psychology General Administration) and the Faculty of Economics with Learning programs in Banking and Finance-Business Administration. During the first academic year, about 1,000 students attended studies. A year later, this new institution offered undergraduate degrees in study programs: Preschool Teacher Education, Primary Education Teacher, English Language, Nursing, Engineering Computer and Information Technology, thus finalising the 2010-2011 academic year with the opening of two new faculties: Faculty of Medical Sciences and the Faculty of Architecture and Engineering. Academic Year 2010-2011 finds the University of Berat with about 2600 students in the first cycle of study.

== History ==
Albanian University (AU) is part of the company "UFO SHPK" established on 25.05.1994, and registered under the legislation in force with the National Registration Center, with unique identification number J82025002B. AU was established in accordance with the legislation in force by Decision No. 197 of the Council of Ministers, dated 10.04.2004 "On granting permission for the opening of the private university "UFO dental"". By Decision No. 597 of the Council of Ministers, dated 28.05.2009 the name of the private university "UFO dental" changed to "UFO University". In accordance with the legislation in force and by Decision No. 603 of the Council of Ministers, dated 24.08.2011 the name of the private university "UFO University" was changed to "Albanian University".

== See also ==
- List of universities in Albania
