= Agricultural University of Plovdiv =

Agricultural science university in Plovdiv, Bulgaria

Coordinates: 42.1344°N 24.7658°E

- Type: Public
- Established: 1945
- Rector: Boryana Ivanova PhD
- Location: Plovdiv, Bulgaria
- Campus: Urban
- Website: www.au-plovdiv.bg/en/

The Agricultural University of Plovdiv is a university in Plovdiv, Bulgaria

== History ==
The Agricultural University of Plovdiv was founded in 1945 in the city of Plovdiv, Bulgaria. It has strengthened its positions as a national centre of agricultural science and education in Bulgaria.

In 2006 the National Evaluation and Accreditation Agency awarded the Agricultural University – Plovdiv with an institutional accreditation and the highest grade of "Very Good". The Institution provides training for three academic degrees – Bachelor, Master and PhD. Foreign applicants who have completed the Preparatory training in Bulgarian language may study in Plovdiv.

The university has the faculties:

- Faculty of Agriculture
- Faculty of Horticulture and Wine
- Faculty of Crop Protection and Agroecology
- Faculty of Economics
- As well as the departments for language training, physical education and sports technology

The university is a member of the Balkan Universities Network, which includes select universities in Albania, Bosnia-Herzegovina, Bulgaria, Greece, Kosovo, Croatia, Romania, Serbia, Slovenia, Turkey, North Macedonia, Moldova, and Montenegro.
