= International Balkan University =

Private university in Skopje, North Macedonia

- Universiteti Ndërkombëtar i Ballkanit; Uluslararası Balkan Üniversitesi
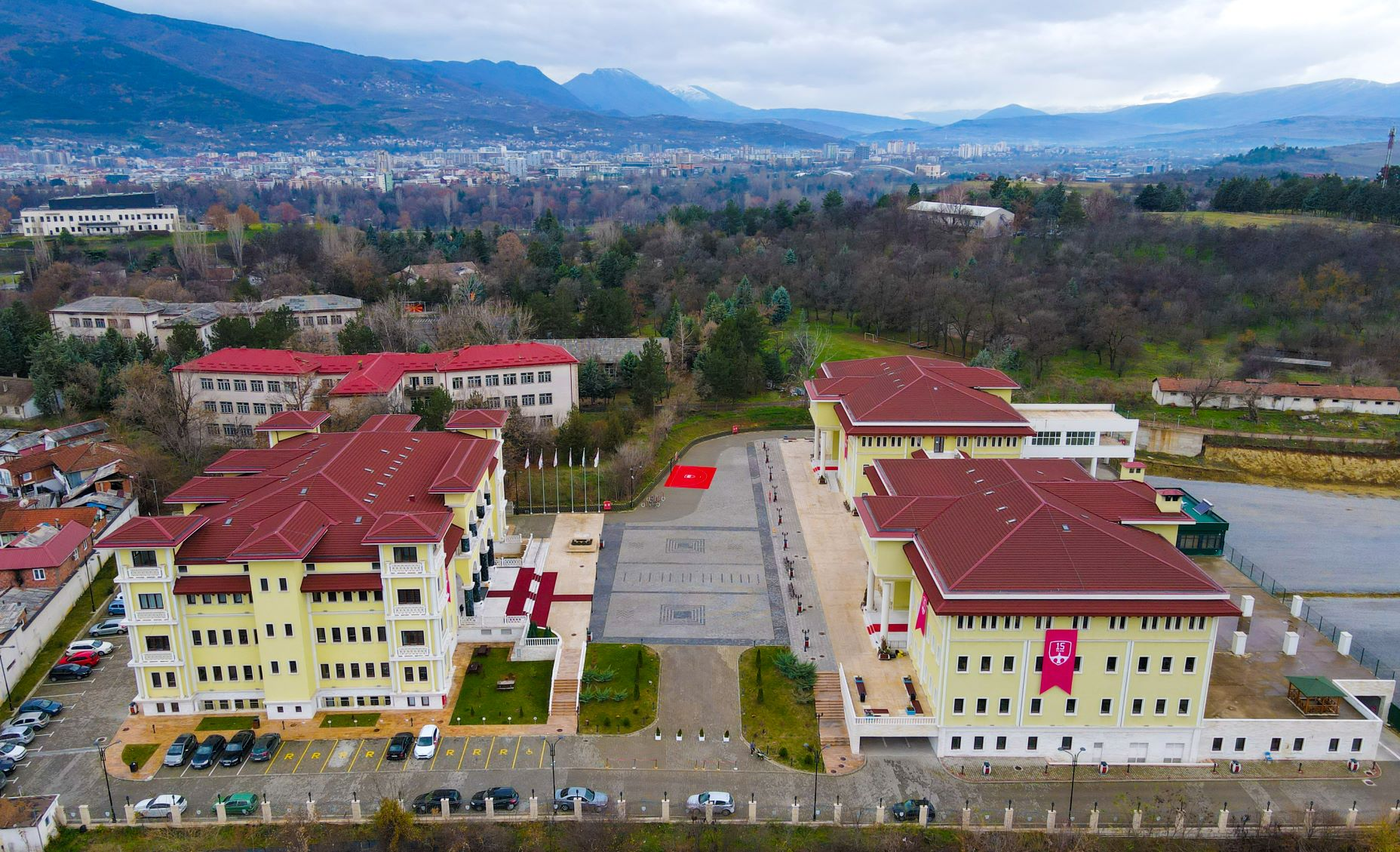
- International Balkan University campus
- Motto: Excellence for the future.
- Type: private, foundation-owned, not-for-profit
- Established: 2006; 20 years ago
- Rector: Prof. Dr. Lutfi Sunar
- Students: 3,800 (2024–25)
- Location: Skopje, North Macedonia; 42°00′06″N 21°26′05″E
- Campus: Urban
- Colours: Red and White
- Nickname: IBU
- Website: www.ibu.edu.mk

International Balkan University (IBU) is a private foundation university established in 2006 in Skopje, the capital of North Macedonia. It was founded by the Foundation for Education and Culture "Üsküp". The university has a 50,000 m² campus and comprises eight faculties, one vocational school, and one language school.

== Academic Structure ==
IBU offers 26 undergraduate, 24 master’s, and 9 doctoral programs. In the 2024–2025 academic year, the university enrolled around 3,800 students. Since its establishment, over 2,000 students have graduated. The academic activities are carried out by more than 260 full-time and part-time staff, supported by over 60 administrative personnel.

== Campus and Facilities ==
The university campus includes 40 classrooms with a capacity of 2,547 students and 30 laboratories.

- The Balkan Laboratories provide 16 labs across 1,438 m² for health and natural sciences.
- The Health Simulation Center covers 400 m² and is equipped with robotic systems.
- The Balkan Dental Polyclinic, with 48 units, aims to serve more than 1,000 patients annually as of 2025.
- The HALKBANK Library hosts over 10,000 books, offers 317 reading seats, and serves approximately 1,000 students daily.

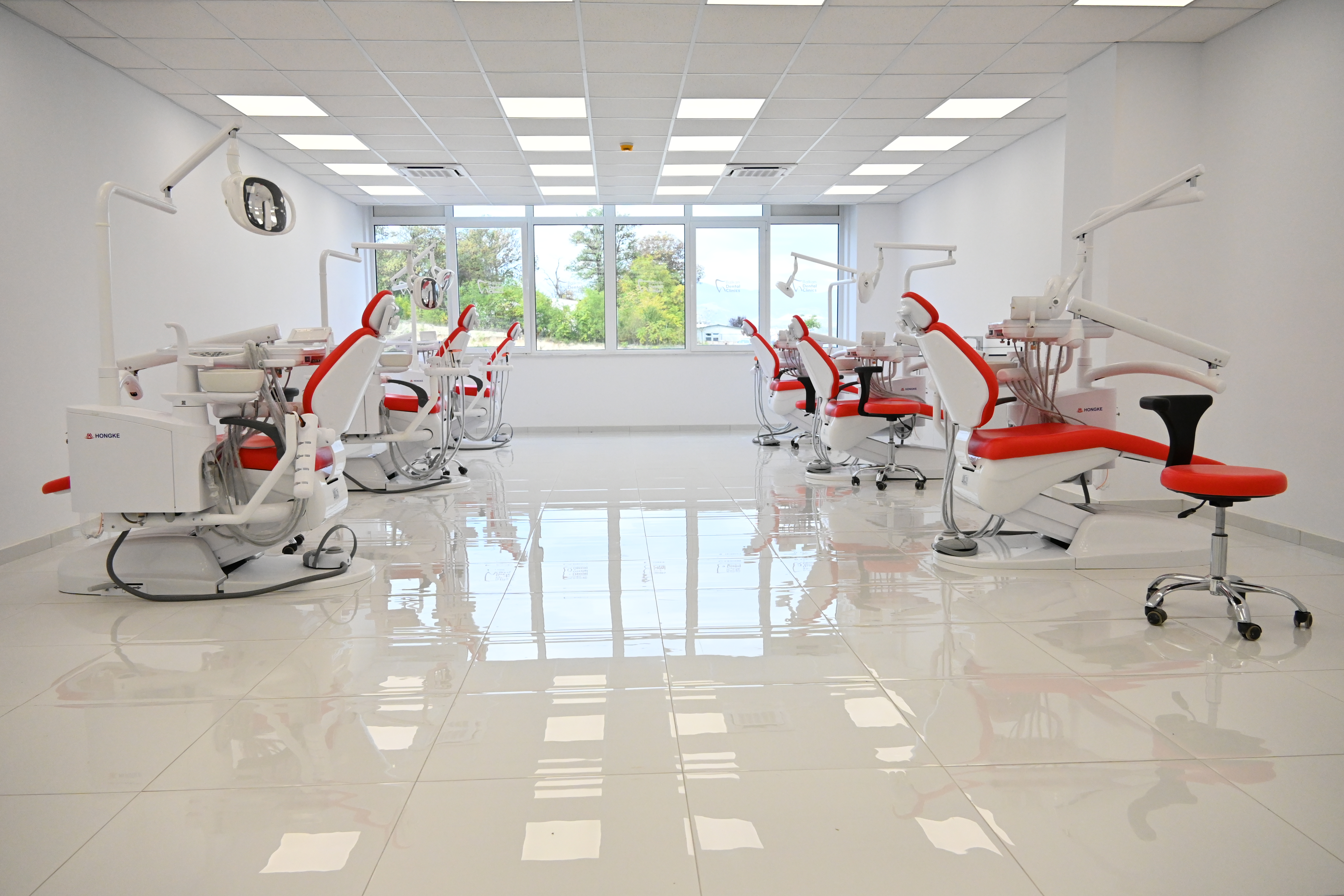
Balkan Dental Polyclinic

== Recognition and Accreditation ==
IBU is listed in the Turkish ÖSYM Higher Education Guide and also serves as an ÖSYM exam center in the Balkans. Its diplomas are recognized across the European Union; accreditation has been confirmed by Germany’s Anabin and Greece’s Hellenic NARIC-DOATAP.

== Research and Innovation ==
The Research and Project Office has carried out projects with a combined budget exceeding €600,000.

- InnoX Innovation Center and BIT Loft support entrepreneurship and innovative ideas.
- In 2025, the Borsa Istanbul Economy and Finance Simulation Laboratory (BISTLAB) is expected to open in cooperation with Borsa İstanbul.

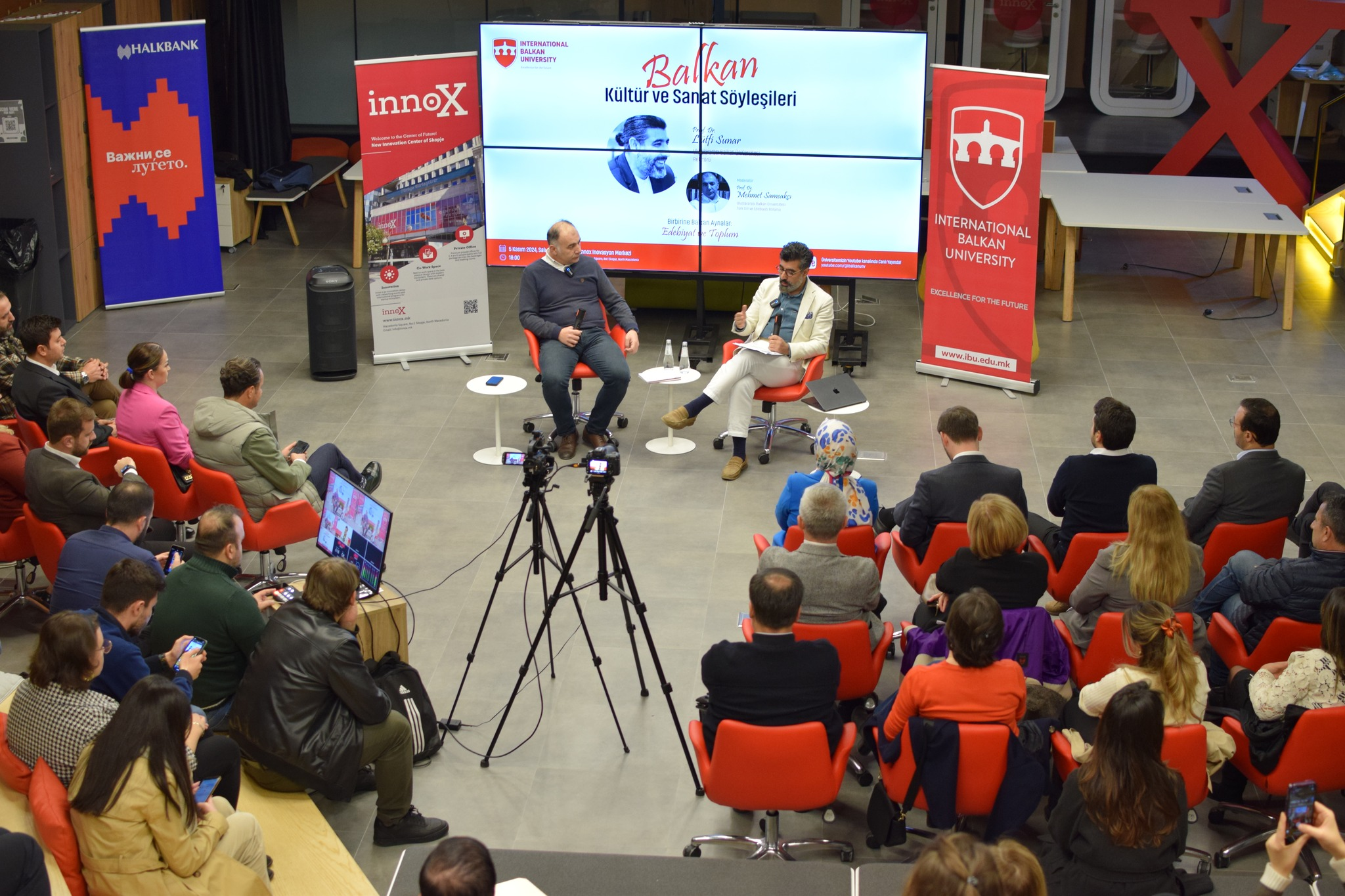
Innox Innovation Center

== Digitalization ==
IBU has developed the HELLO Integrated University Management Program, which digitalizes processes from student automation to HR, library services, and campus security. The system includes more than 15 modules.

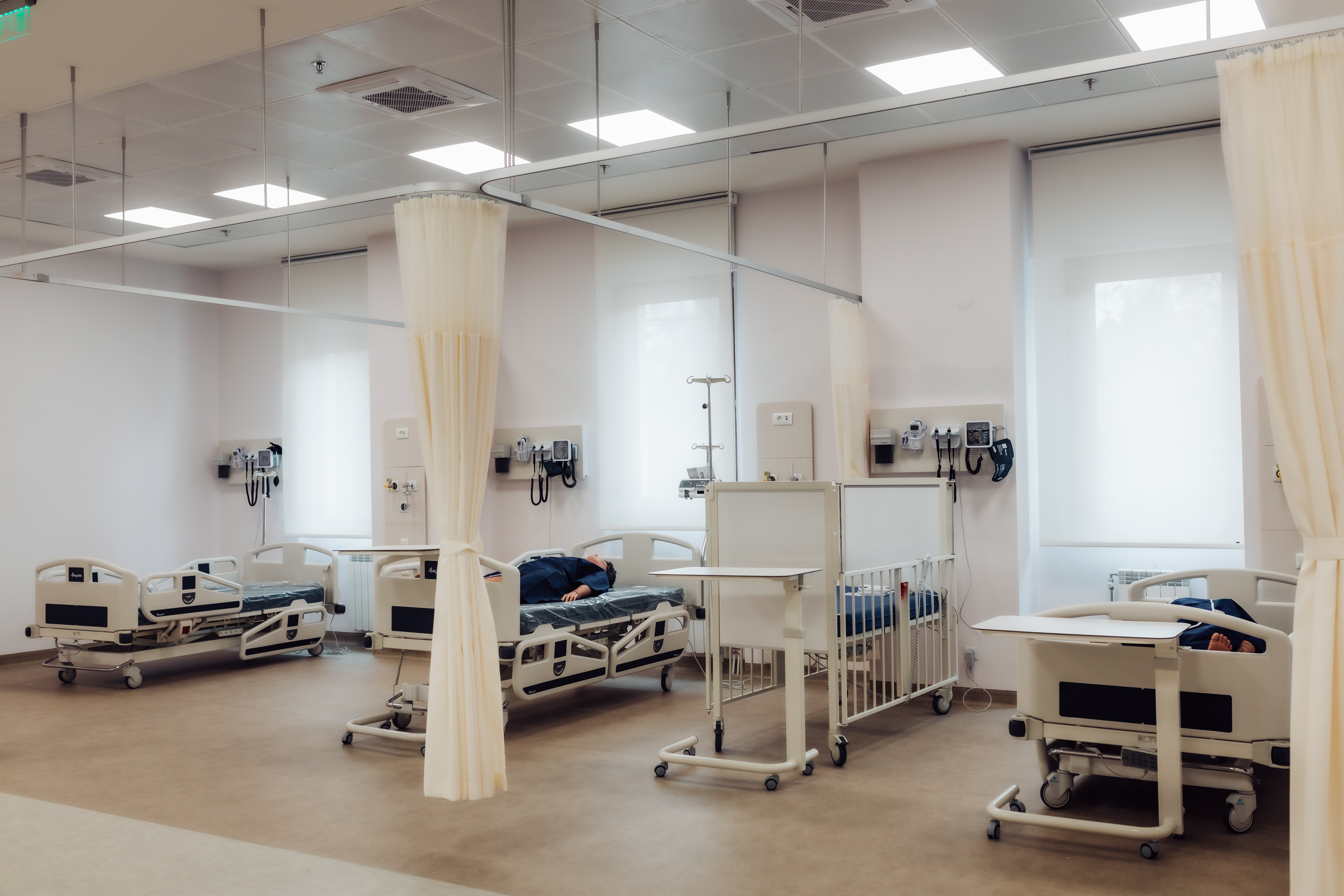
Health Simulation Center

== Culture and Arts ==
The university hosts national and international exhibitions through the Balkan Art Gallery, produces media content via Studio Balkan, and carries out academic publishing activities through Balkan University Press.

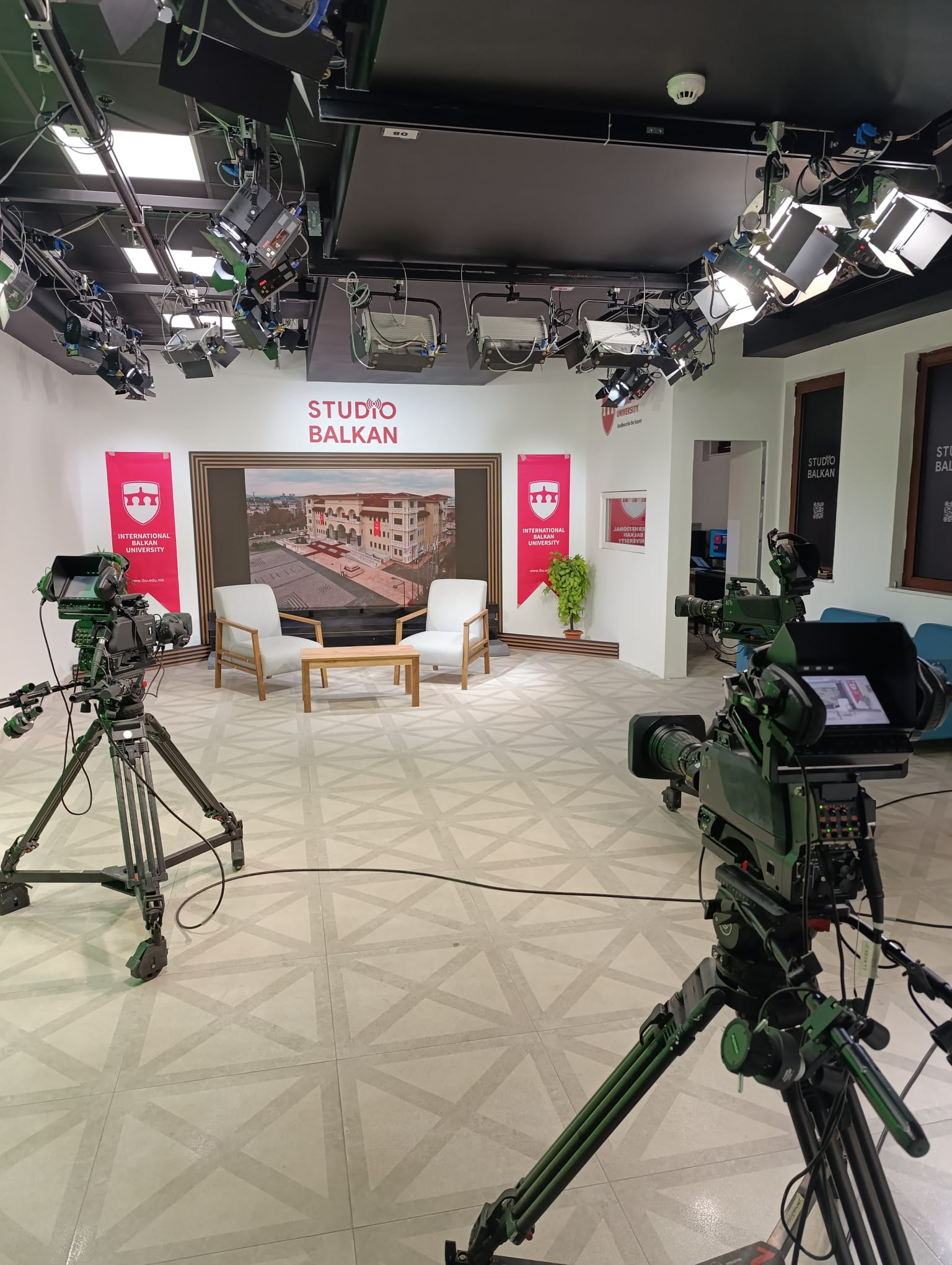
Studio Balkan

== International Cooperation ==
Students from more than 20 countries study at IBU. The university is a member of the European University Association, the Balkan Universities Association, the World Design Organization, and the ACRID Network.

== Bachelor, Master and PhD programs ==
The university offers Bachelor's, Master's, and several PhD study programs at its 8 academic units:

- Faculty of Engineering
- Faculty of Economics and Administrative Sciences
- Faculty of Art and Design
- Faculty of Humanities and Social Sciences
- Faculty of Education
- Faculty of Law
- Faculty of Dental Medicine
- Vocational Medical School
