= Aldent University =

University in Tirana, Albania

- Type: stomatology
- Established: September 27, 2003
- Founders: Adem Alushi
- Location: Tirana, Albania; 41°16′52.96″N 19°51′35.65″E
- Website: ual.edu.al

Aldent University (Albanian: Universiteti Aldent) is a private higher education institution in Tirana, Albania, specializing in medical and dental sciences. Founded in 2006 through a decision of the Council of Ministers (No. 673, dated September 27, 2006), it began as a two-year pre-university program in dental laboratory techniques in 2003 before gaining full university status.[1] The university is institutionally accredited by the Albanian Ministry of Education and offers undergraduate, master's, and professional specialization programs exclusively in health-related fields.[1]

Located at Rruga e Dibrës, No. 235, in the Te Selvia area of Tirana, Aldent University emphasizes practical training with a faculty of specialists trained in countries such as Italy, Germany, and the United States.[1] It comprises three faculties: the Faculty of Dental Sciences, which includes programs in stomatology (a five-year integrated master's), dental laboratory technology, and specializations in oral surgery and orthodontics; the Faculty of Medical Technical Sciences, covering physiotherapy, medical laboratory techniques, general nursing, and imaging/radiotherapy; and the Faculty of Medical Sciences, focused on pharmacy.[1] All programs are designed to meet international standards, with nine distinct offerings across bachelor's, master's, and three-year specialization cycles.[1]

The institution fosters international partnerships, including internships and collaborations with universities such as Nicolaus Copernicus University in Poland, Palacký University in the Czech Republic, Ankara University and Hacettepe University in Turkey, and Acıbadem University in Turkey.[1] Aldent University also hosts scientific conferences, career orientation events for high school graduates and students, and maintains a commitment to advancing healthcare education in Albania through specialized, student-centered instruction.[1]

== See also ==
- List of universities in Albania
