= Raiffeisen (Albania) =

Raiffeisen Bank
- Type: Bank
- Industry: Finance
- Founded: 2004
- Headquarters: Tirana
- Area served: Albania
- Products: Financial Services
- Revenue: €3.36 billion (2024)
- Website: www.raiffeisen.al

The Raiffeisen Bank is one of the largest banks in Albania. In 2021, it had a market share of 15.35%, making it the third largest bank in Albania.

== Background ==
It was originally known as Banka e Kursimeve (Savings Bank of Albania), but following its acquisition by Raiffeisen Zentralbank (RZB) during 2004 it was rebranded as Raiffeisen Bank. Since the acquisition, Raiffeisen has implemented retail lending and services, starting with ATM services and debit cards, and later additional retail activities. The bank is also building its corporate and SME businesses.
