= Luigj Gurakuqi University Library =

Luigj Gurakuqi University Library (Albanian: Biblioteka e Universitetit të Shkodrës “Luigj Gurakuqi”) is the library of the Luigj Gurakuqi University of Shkodra in Shkodër, Albania. It traces its history to the establishment of the Pedagogical Institute in 1957 with a stock of about 1000 books, mainly in Albanian. Today, this library has about 150,000 books. It includes a holding of thirty two rare volumes form the early part of the sixteenth century. The older stock is in the process of digitization to ensure longevity of the items and improve advisability. The library runs exchanges with Albanian and foreign libraries.

== Bibliography ==
- World Guide to Libraries, Thomson Gale, K. G. Saur.
