= Canadian Institute of Technology =

Albanian private university college

- Motto: Open your door to the world!
- Type: Private university. Study levels offered: Bachelor and Master of Science
- Established: November 10, 2011; 14 years ago
- Rector: Prof. Dr. Sokol Abazi
- Faculty: +50
- Administrative staff: +20
- Students: +1000
- Location: Kompleksi Xhura, Xhanfise Keko street, Tirana, Albania
- Colors: Red Black
- Website: cit.edu.al

The Canadian Institute of Technology (CIT; Albanian: Instituti Kanadez i Teknologjisë) is a for-profit university college located in Tirana, Albania. The university college is known to offer Bachelor and Master programs, entirely in English, divided into two faculties, the two faculties being the Faculty of Engineering and the Faculty of Economy. Its curriculum is based on the Canadian one. The university college was established on 10 November 2011.

== History and organisation ==
The Canadian Institute of Technology (CIT) was established on 10 November 2011. The university college's philosophy "aims to provide potential students with the necessary and competitive skills demanded by the Albanian and Balkan region as well as the European and North-American labor markets." The university college is organised in two faculties, the Faculty of Engineering and Faculty of Economy.

The Faculty of Engineering is composed of the following units:

- Department of Software Engineering
- Department of Industrial Engineering
- Scientific Research Unit “CIRD Engineering”

The Faculty of Economy is composed of the following units:

- Department of Business Administration
- Department of Business Administration and Information Technology
- Scientific Research Unit “CIRD Economy”

The university college received accreditation on March 25, 2016.

== Mission ==
The official website of the Canadian Institute of Technology states that "through the promotion of well-prepared curricula, teaching and research activities as well as the opening of new programs", the university college "has as its mission the development of students' individual skills and abilities, promotion of competition and improvement of education by appreciating and respecting cultural diversity and values of Albania."
