= University of Tirana =

Public university in Tirana, Albania

Coordinates: 41°19′00″N 19°49′18″E

- Universiteti i Tiranës
- Seal of the University of Tirana
- Type: Public
- Established: 30 May 1957; 69 years ago
- Affiliations: Balkan Universities Network; Erasmus Mundus; UNSHP; UNICA; EUA; AUF; UNIMED; CMU; BSUN; ASECU; IUC. Partners: University of Bamberg Germany; University of Nebraska–Lincoln United States
- President: Artan Hoxha
- Faculty: 900+
- Students: 35,000
- Location: Tirana, Albania
- Campus: Urban and Suburban (under construction)
- Colours: Red and black
- Website: unitir.edu.al

University rankings

Regional – Overall
- QS Emerging Europe and Central Asia: 401-450 (2022)

The University of Tirana (Albanian: Universiteti I Tiranës, abbreviated UT) is a public university located at the beginning of the main boulevard, in Tirana, Albania. It was established in 1957 as the State University of Tirana (SUT) by merging five existing institutes of higher education.

The main building was designed by Italian architect Gherardo Bosio at the beginning of 1940. It is situated at the Mother Teresa Square, south of the city center of Tirana.

While Albanian is the primary language of instruction, numerous foreign-language faculties deliver their university lectures in English, French, Greek, Italian, Spanish, German, Chinese, and other languages.

The University of Tirana was founded in 1957 as the State University of Tirana (Albanian: Universiteti Shtetëror i Tiranës), through the merging of five existing institutes of higher education, the most important of which was the Institute of Sciences, founded in 1947. After Albania's communist dictator Enver Hoxha died in 1985, the university was renamed the Enver Hoxha University of Tirana (Albanian: Universiteti i Tiranës Enver Hoxha), and it carried his name until 1992, when the anti-Communist Democratic Party of Albania's victory in the parliamentary elections put the final nail in the coffin of the Albanian communist regime.

== Academics and size ==
The university is Albania's largest and highest-ranking university. It includes eight colleges, 50 academic departments, and 41 study programs or majors. Most programs are offered in Tirana; a few smaller affiliated campuses are located in other Albanian cities, including Saranda in the southern part of the country and Kukës in the north. It offers three-year bachelor's, one- or two-year master's, and three- to five-year doctorate degree programs, in accordance with the Bologna system.

The current campus is urban and decentralised. A new large and centralised campus has been planned in the southeast periphery of Tirana. Student dorms are grouped in a separate location called Student City (Qyteti Studenti) in southeast Tirana.

With 35,000 students, UT is not only Albania's largest university but also among Europe's largest. In 2013, the college accepted 95 new Ph.D. students. These are students in possession of bachelor's degrees.

== Faculties and departments ==
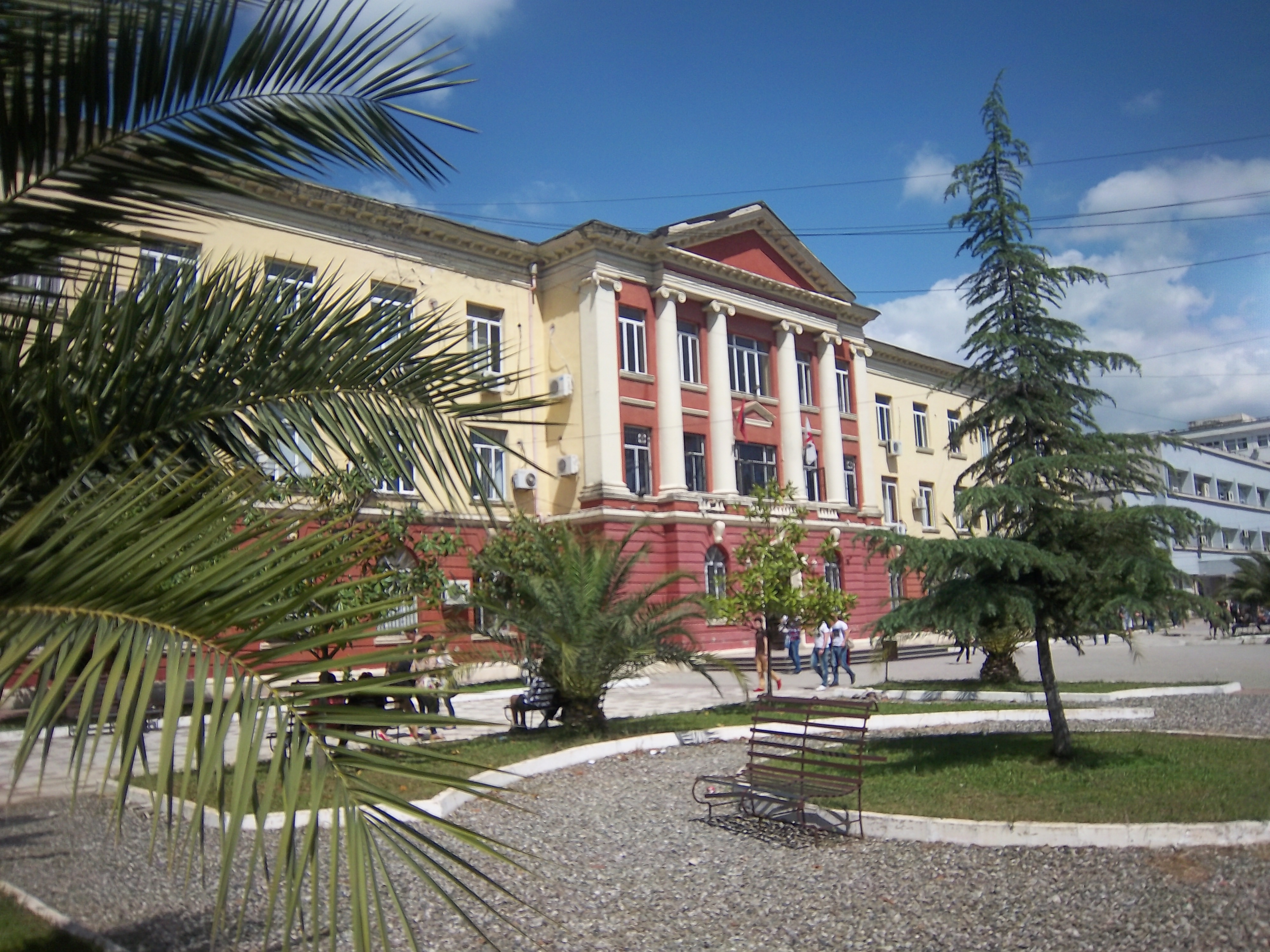
Tirana University's faculty of history and philology

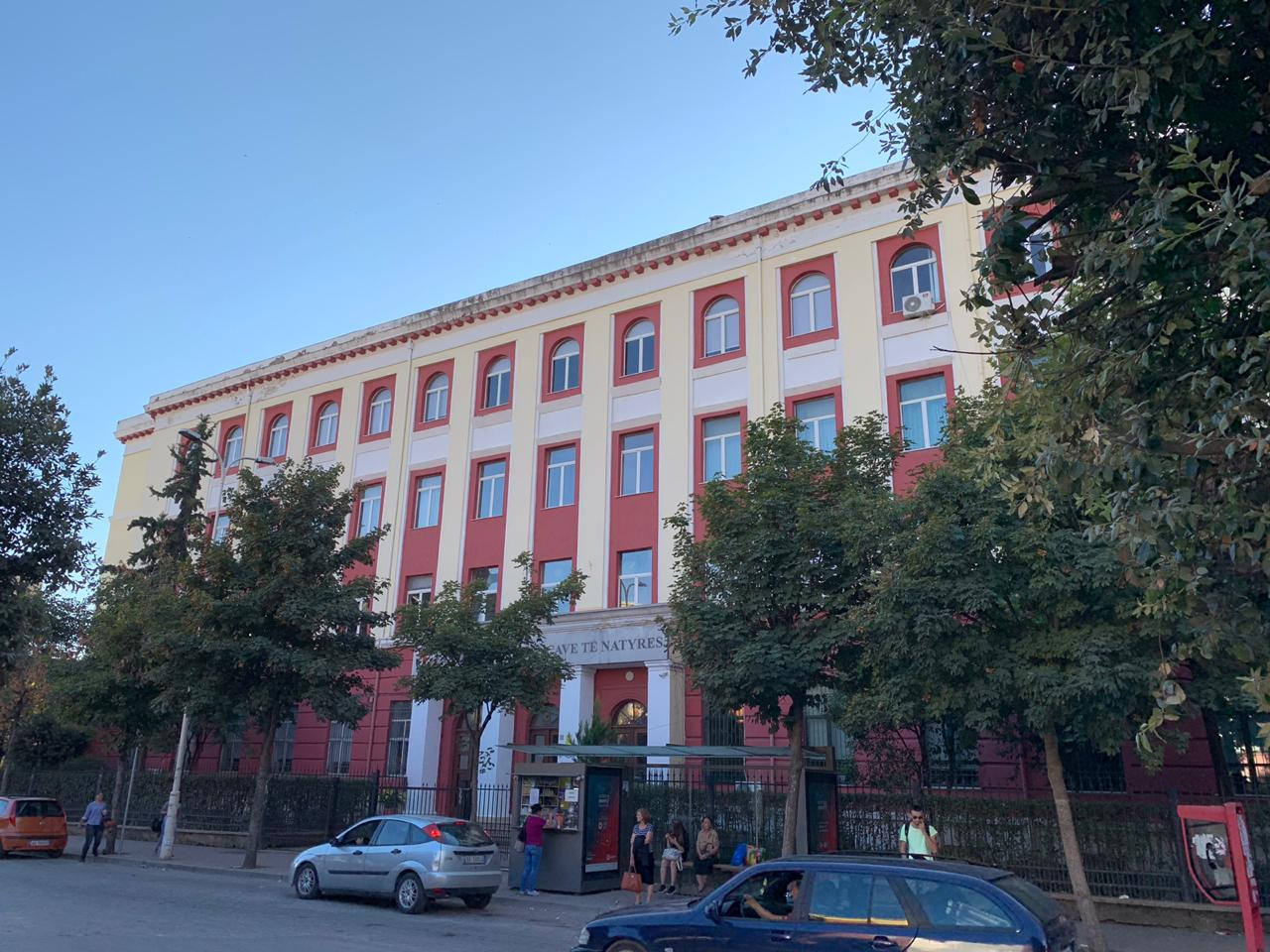
Faculty of Natural Sciences of Tirana

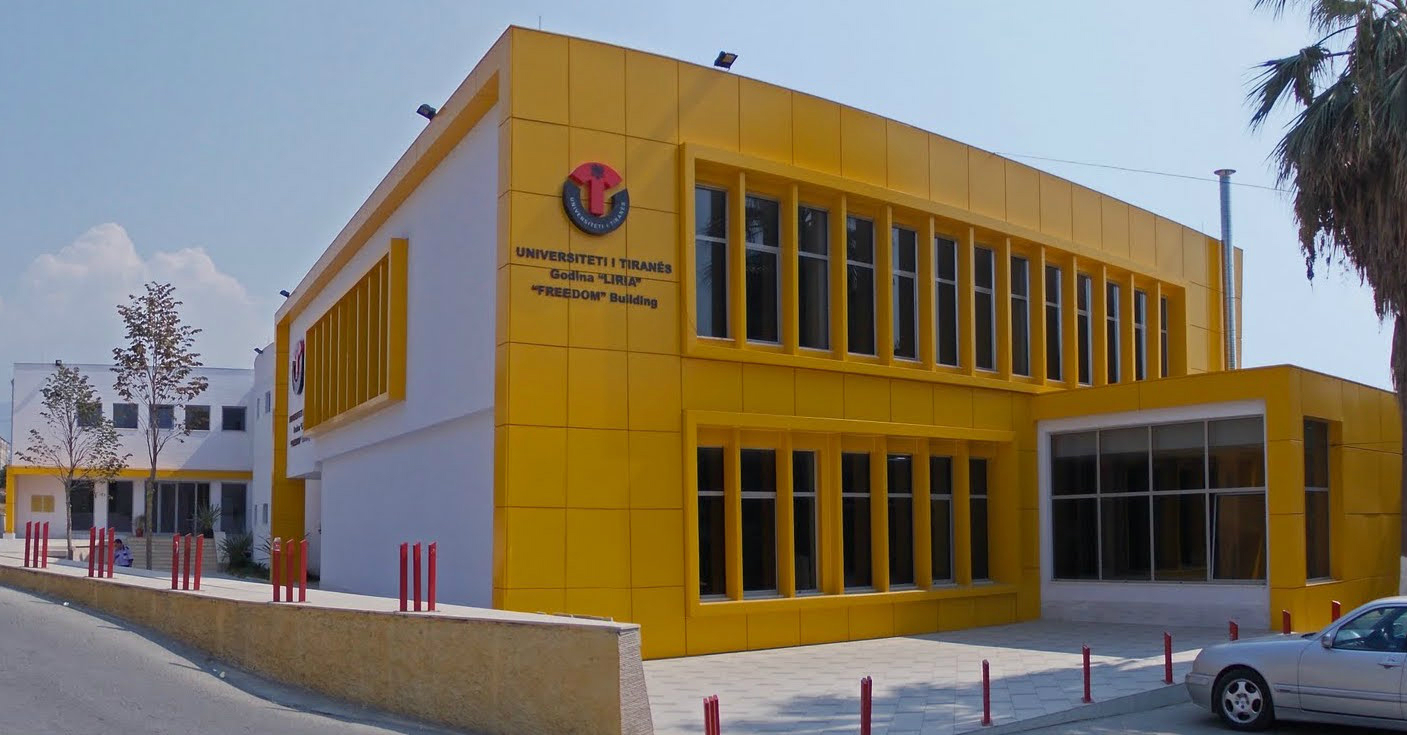
A student dormitory

- Faculty of Social Sciences
- Faculty of Natural Sciences
- Faculty of History and Philology
- Faculty of Law
- Faculty of Economic Sciences
  - Contains the J. Limprecht Library, named after Joseph Limprecht, a United States of America ambassador to Albania from 1999 to 2002.
- Faculty of Foreign Languages
- Department of Physical Education

== Notable people ==
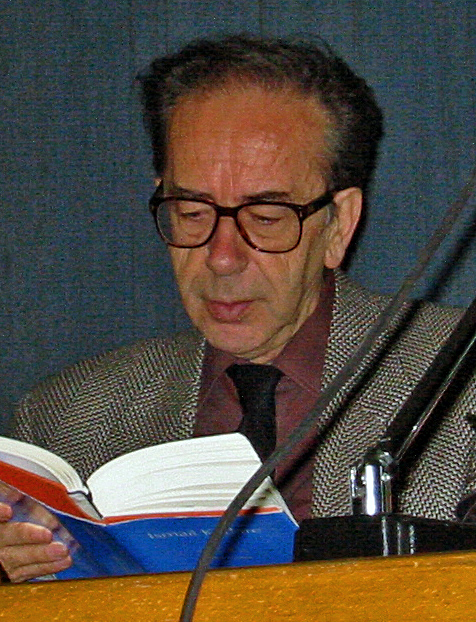
Ismail Kadare

- Sali Berisha (born 1944), cardiologist, resident of Albania and Prime Minister
- Elona Gjebrea (born 1968), Socialist Party of Albania politician
- Shpresa Gjongecaj (born 1952), professor of Numismatics
- Odhise Grillo (1932–2003), writer of children's books
- Besjana Guri, environemntalist and Goldman Prize recipient
- Nexhmije Hoxha (1921–2020), politician
- Shefki Hysa (born 1957), writer and journalist
- Helena Kadare (born 1943), author
- Ismail Kadare (1936–2024), novelist and poet, winner of the 2005 Man Booker International Prize, the 2009 Prince of Asturias Award, and the 2015 Jerusalem Prize
- Ardian Klosi (1957–2012), publicist and activist
- Dhori Kule (born 1957), rector of the University of Tirana
- Pandeli Majko (born 1967), politician
- Jakup Mato (1934–2005), publicist and educational administrator
- Laura Mersini-Houghton, cosmologist, theoretical physicist, and professor
- Ilir Meta (born 1969), Albanian president
- Fatos Nano (1952–2025), prime minister of Albania, member of the Albanian Parliament
- Harilla Papajorgji (1933–2019), politician and professor
- Anila Paparisto, entomologist and 2002 L'Oréal-UNESCO For Women in Science Awards recipient.
- Gentiana Susaj, lawyer and aikidoka.
- Holta Zaçaj, (born 1976), former chairwoman of the Constitutional Court
- Drita Ziri (born 2005), TV host and Miss Earth 2023

== See also ==
- Education in Albania
- List of universities in Albania
