= Quality Assurance Agency of Higher Education =

Government agency of Albania

- Agjencia e Sigurimit të Cilësisë në Arsimin e Lartë
- Official logo

Accreditation agency overview
- Jurisdiction: Albania
- Headquarters: Rruga e Durrësit, Nr 219, Tiranë, AL
- Accreditation agency executive: vacancy, Director
- Website: www.ascal.al

The Quality Assurance Agency of Higher Education (ASCAL) (Albanian: Agjencia e Sigurimit të Cilësisë në Arsimin e Lartë) is an independent public agency responsible for promoting and ensuring the quality of higher education in Albania. ASCAL conducts a thorough, objective and independent evaluation of all higher education institutions and the study programs they have to offer.

== See also ==
- Education in Albania
- List of universities in Albania
