= List of diplomatic missions in North Macedonia =

This article lists diplomatic missions resident in North Macedonia. At present, the capital city of Skopje hosts 32 embassies. Several other countries have missions accredited from other capitals.

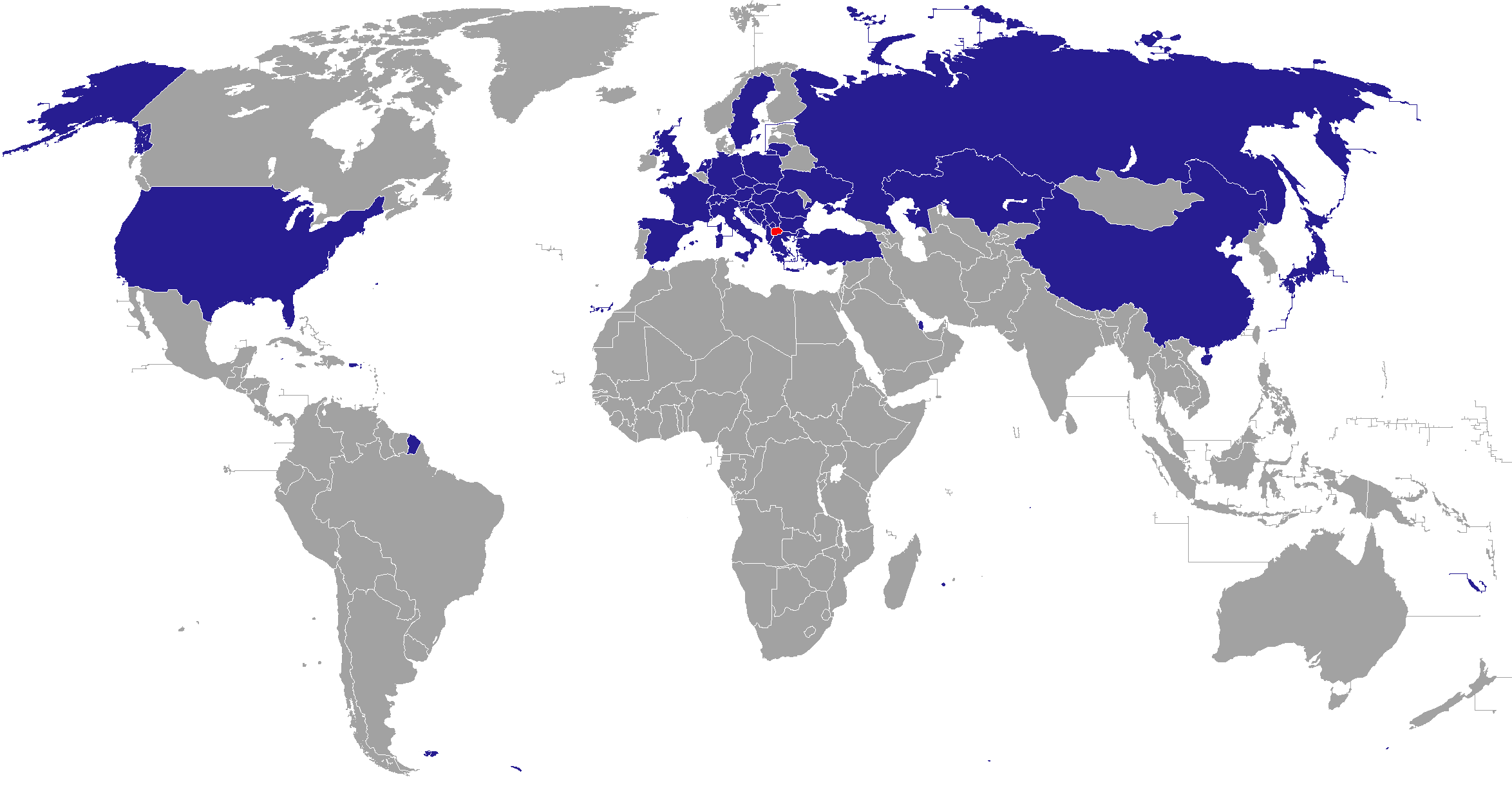
Diplomatic missions in North Macedonia

== Diplomatic missions in Skopje ==
=== Embassies ===
1. Albania
2. Austria
3. Bosnia and Herzegovina
4. Bulgaria
5. China
6. Croatia
7. Czech Republic
8. France
9. Germany
10. Greece
11. Hungary
12. Italy
13. Japan
14. Kazakhstan
15. Kosovo
16. Montenegro
17. Netherlands
18. Poland
19. Qatar
20. Romania
21. Russia
22. Serbia
23. Slovakia
24. Slovenia
25. Sovereign Military Order of Malta
26. Spain
27. Sweden
28. Switzerland
29. Turkey
30. Ukraine
31. United Kingdom
32. United States

=== Other missions or delegations ===
1. European Union (Delegation)
2. Lithuania (Embassy office)

=== Gallery ===
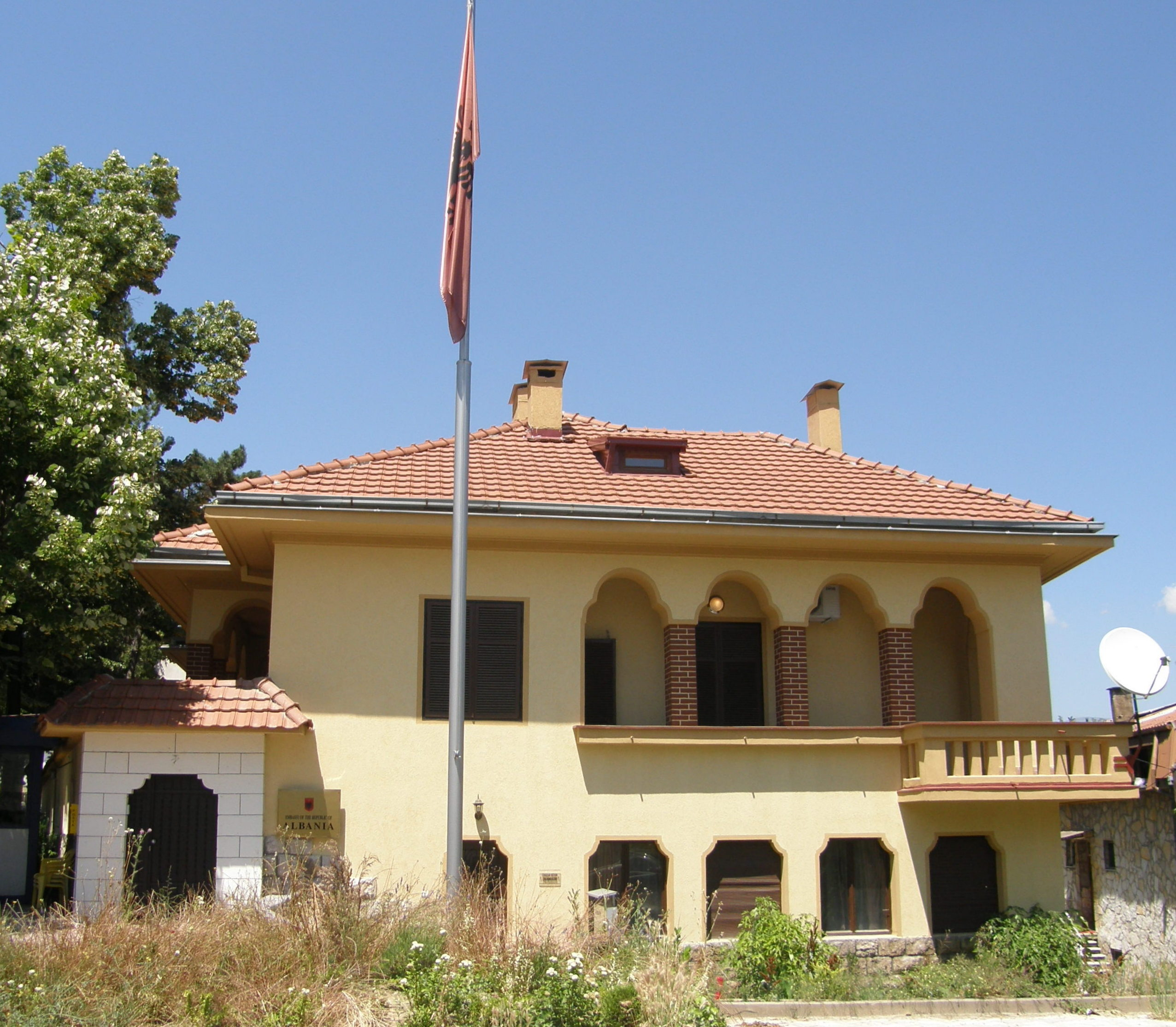
Embassy of Albania

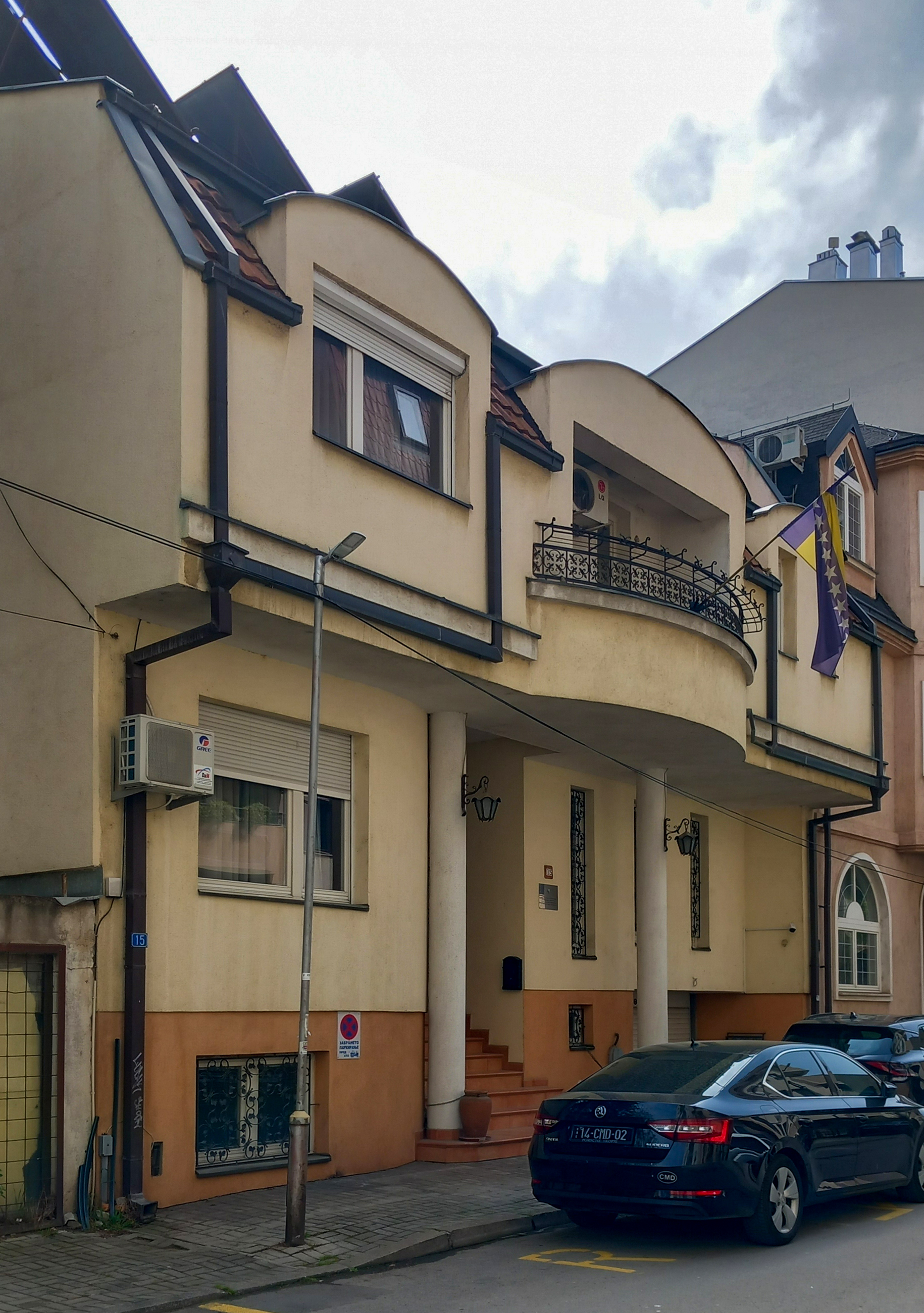
Embassy of Bosnia and Herzegovina

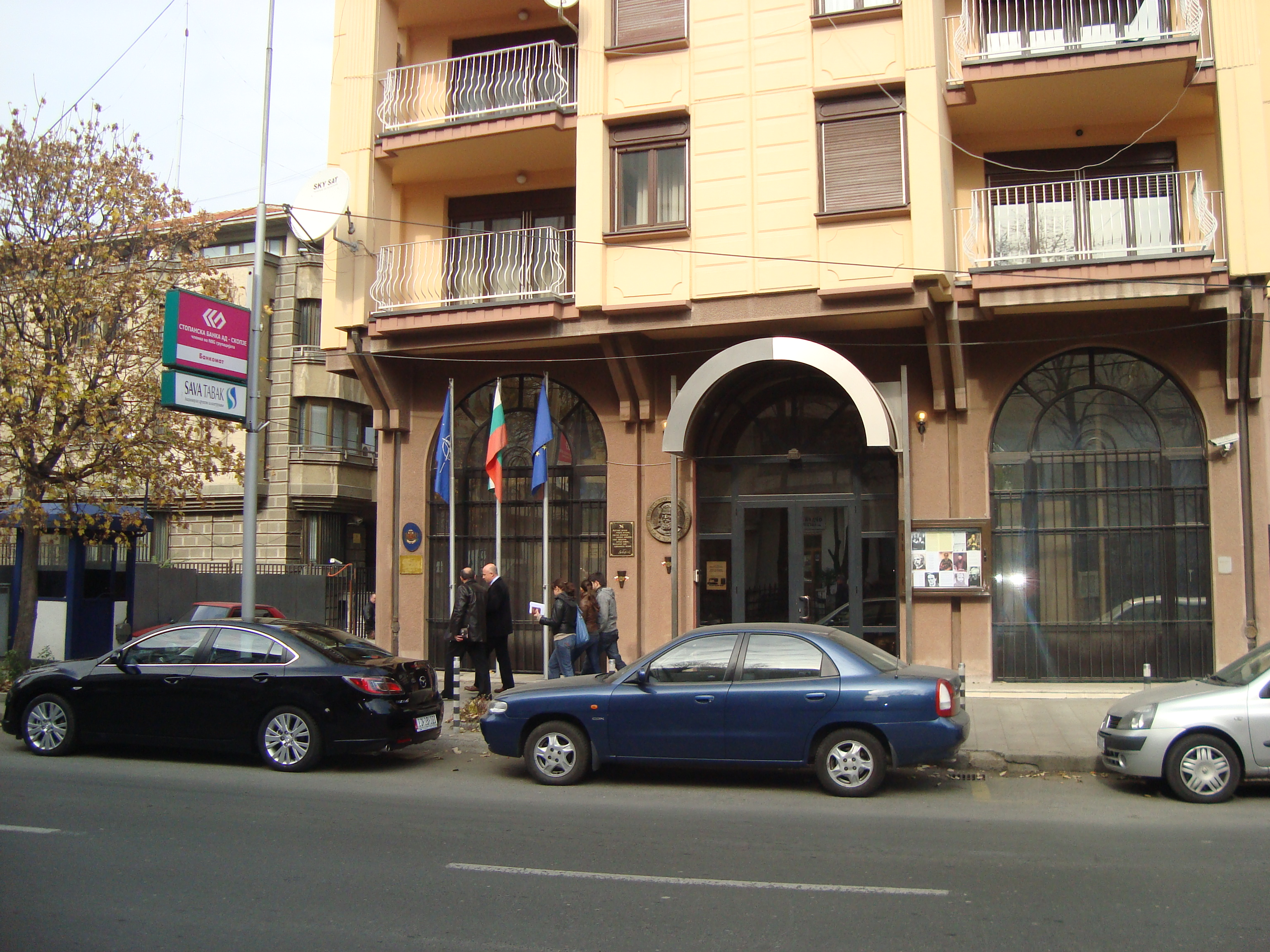
Embassy of Bulgaria

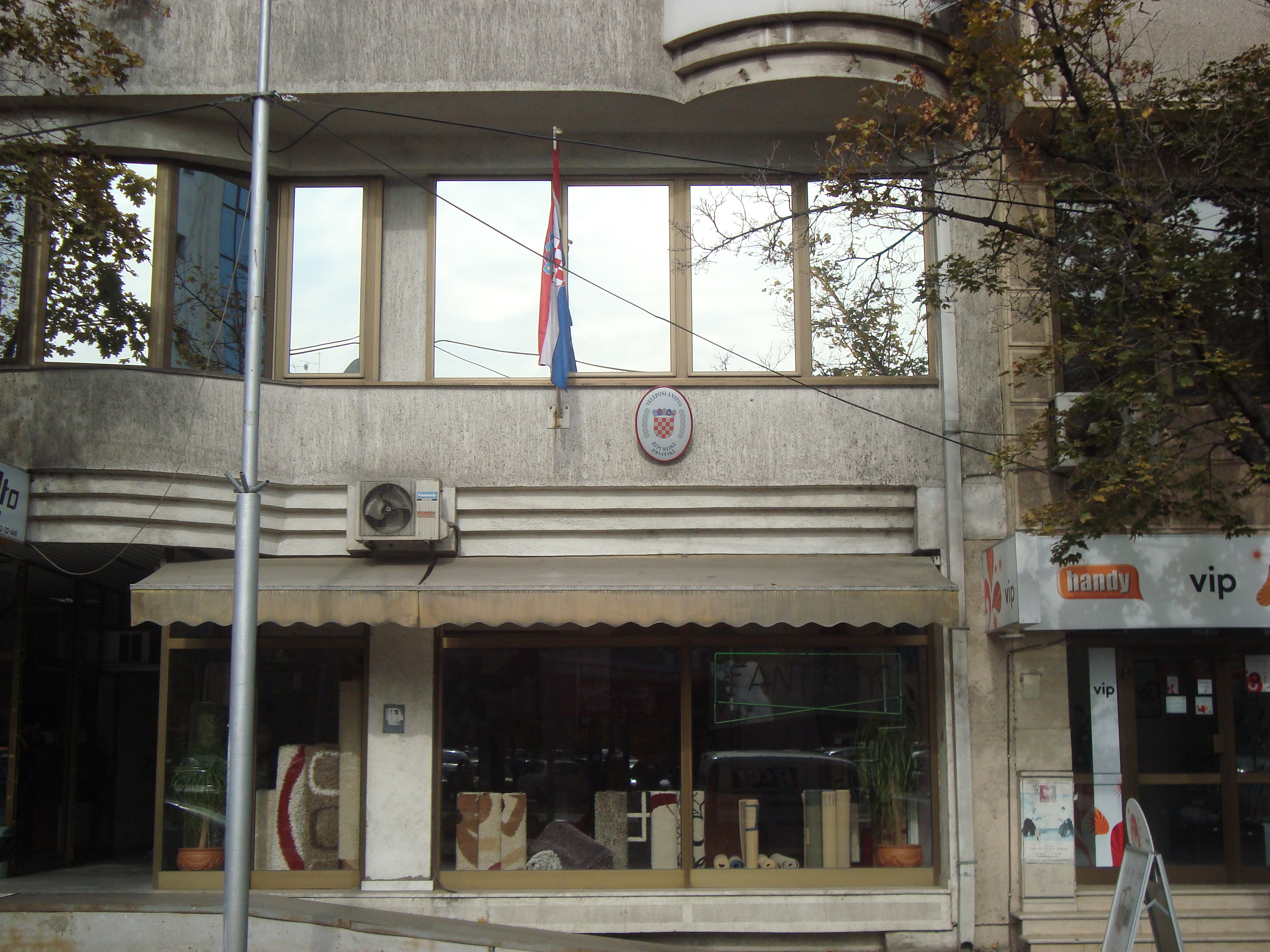
Embassy of Croatia

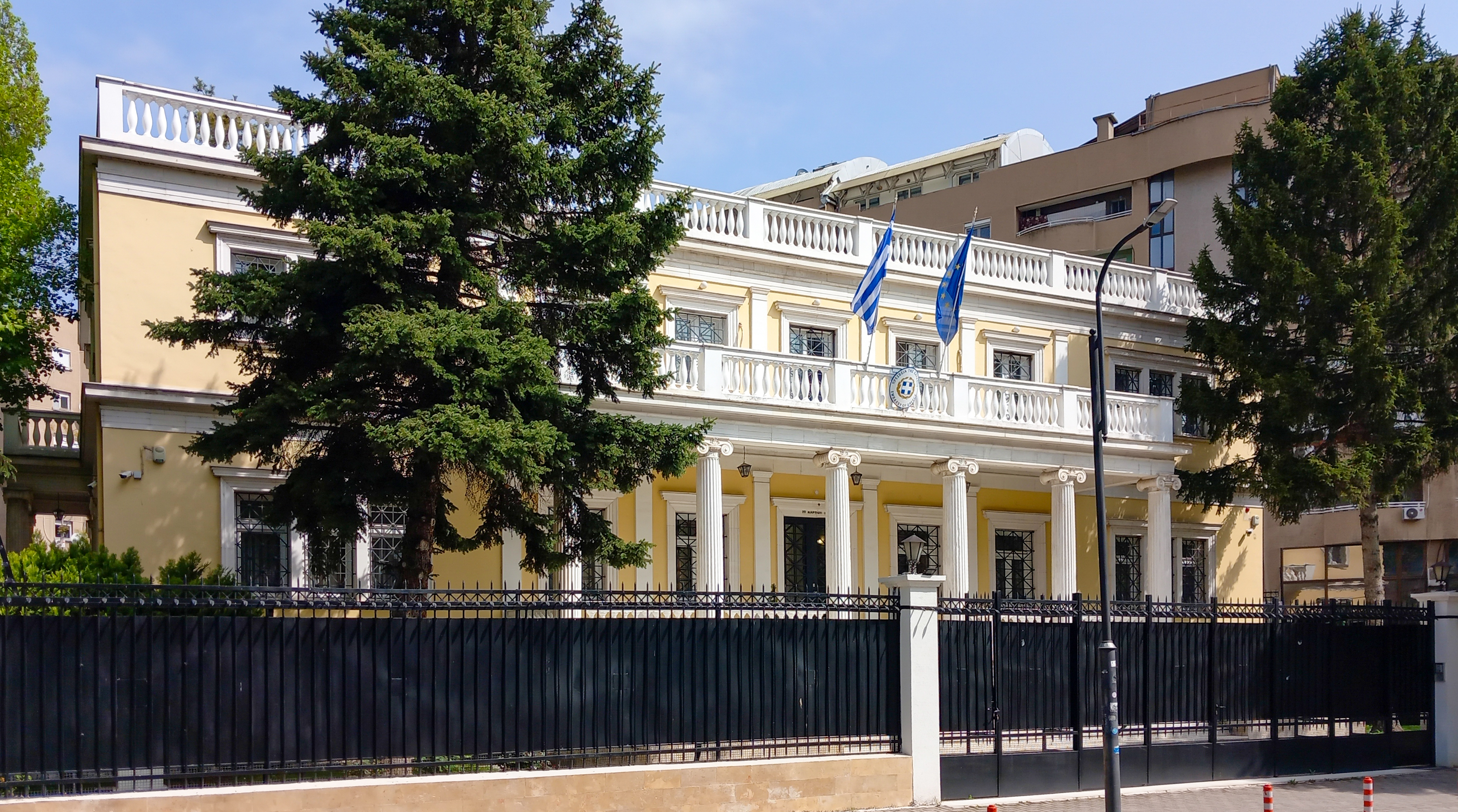
Embassy of Greece

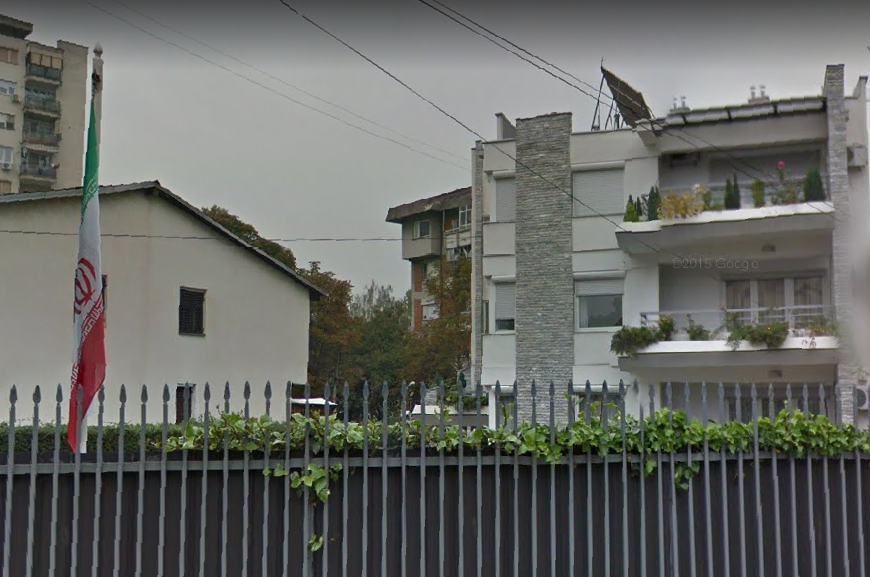
Embassy of Iran

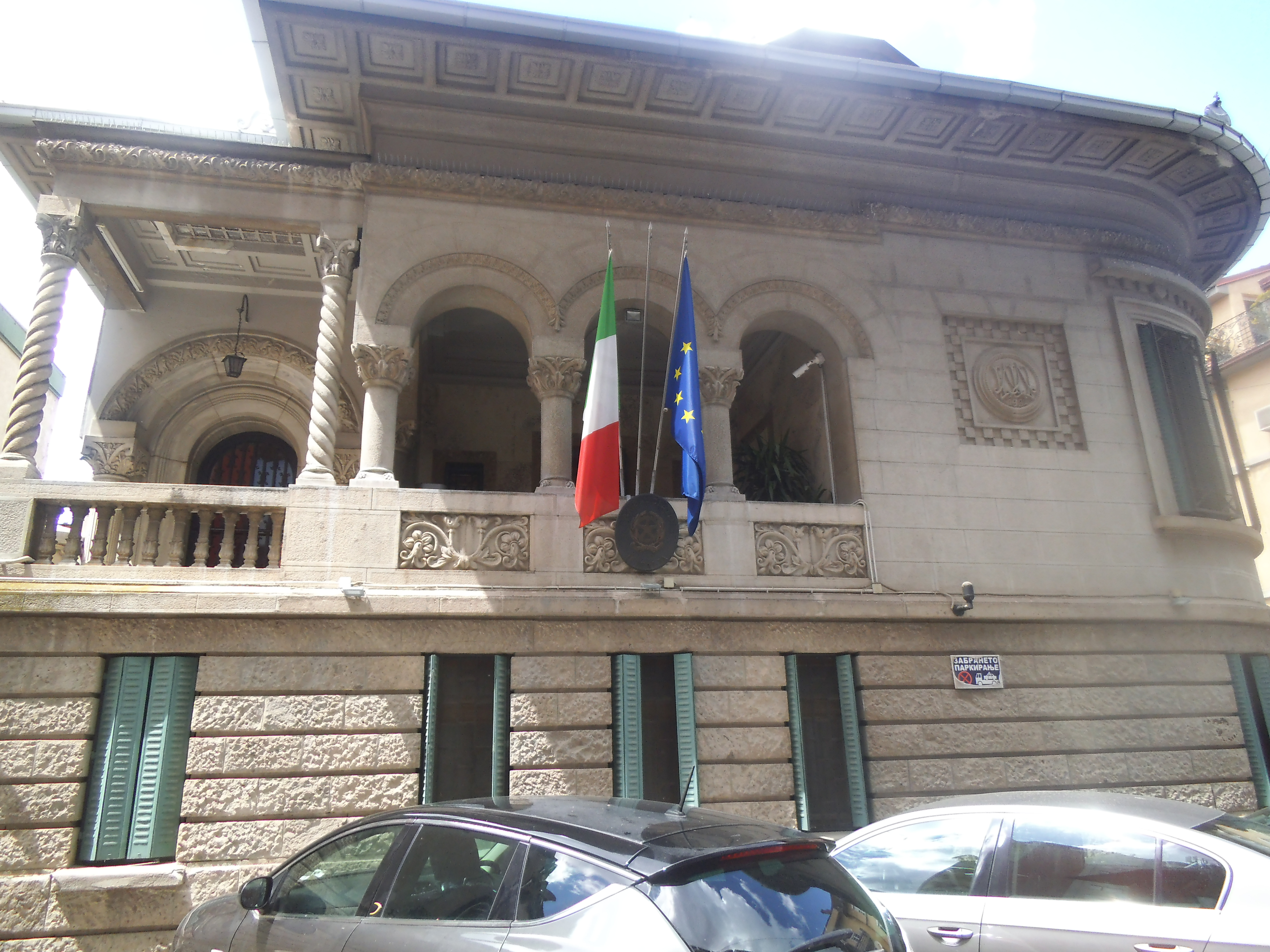
Embassy of Italy

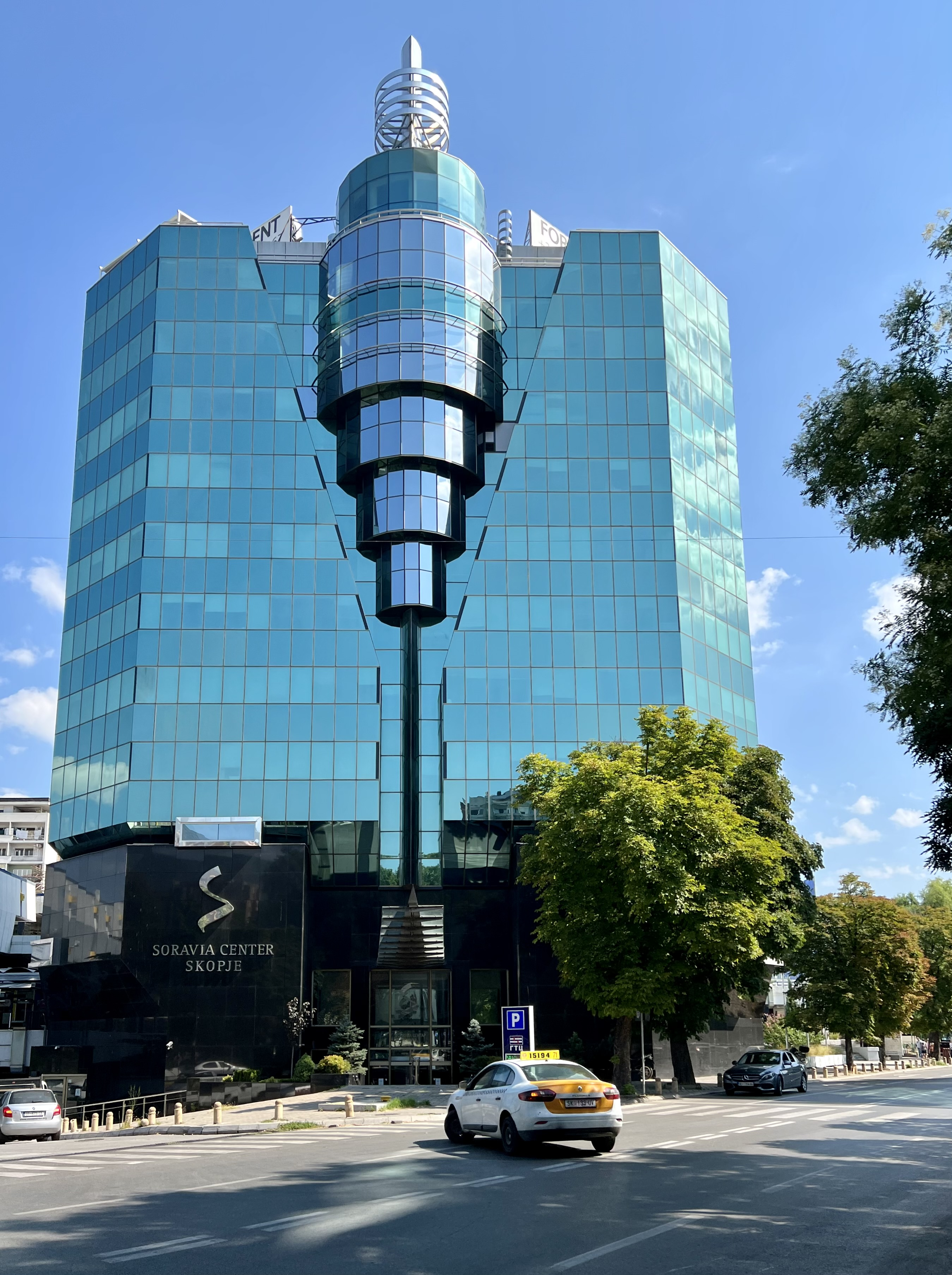
Building hosting the Embassy of Japan

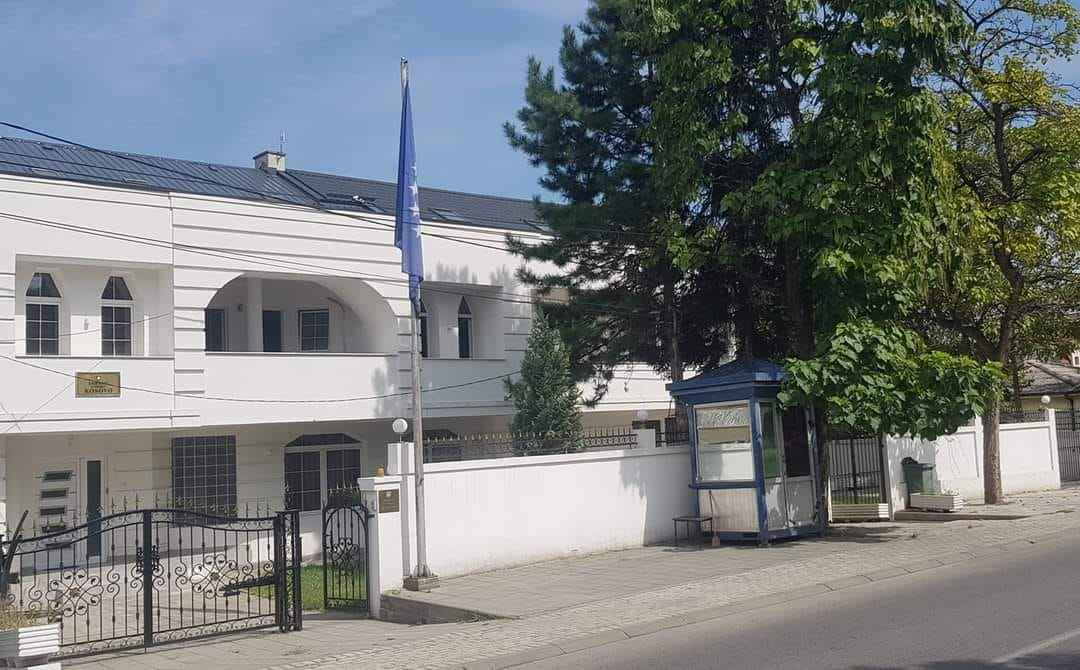
Embassy of Kosovo

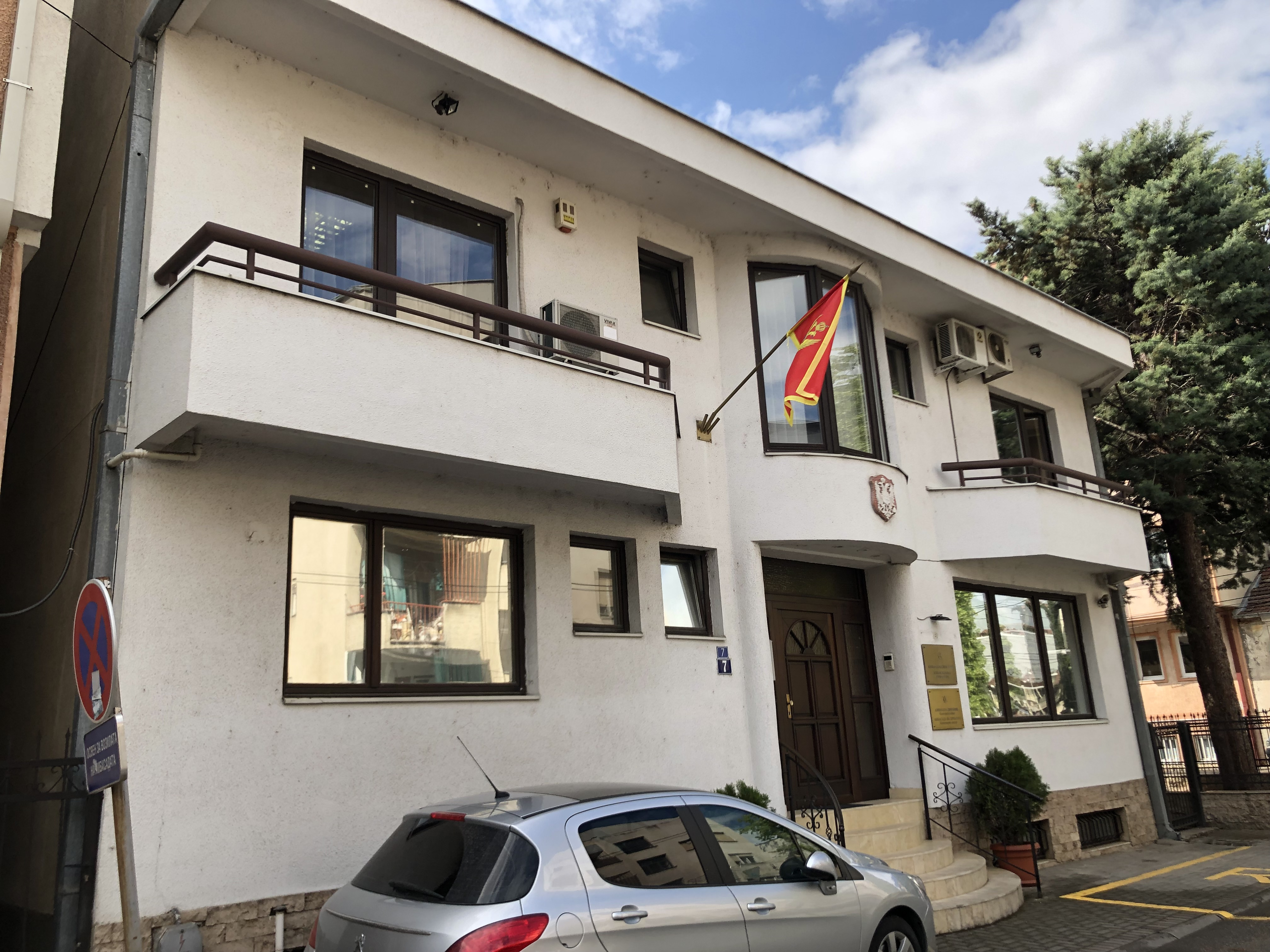
Embassy of Montenegro

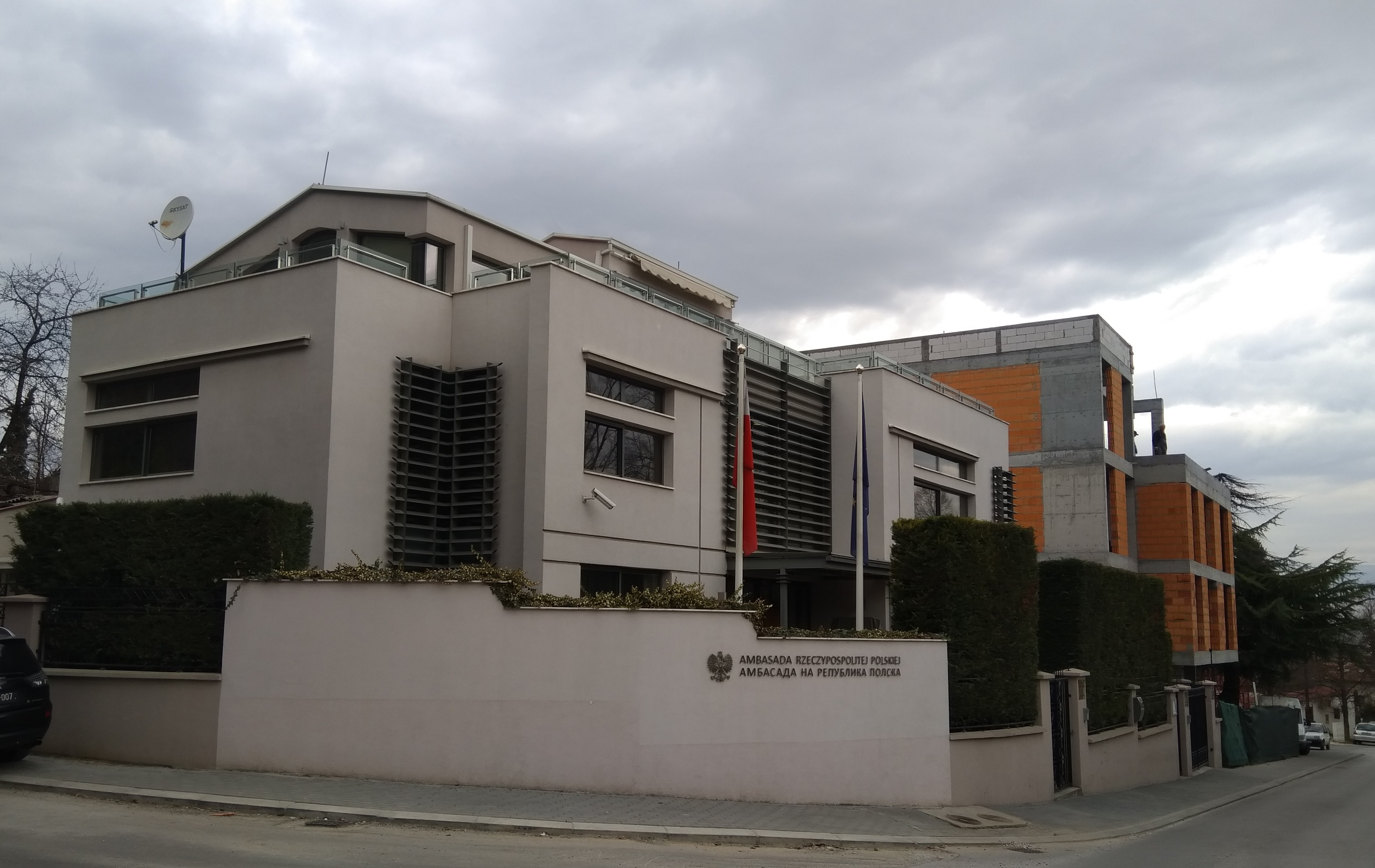
Embassy of Poland

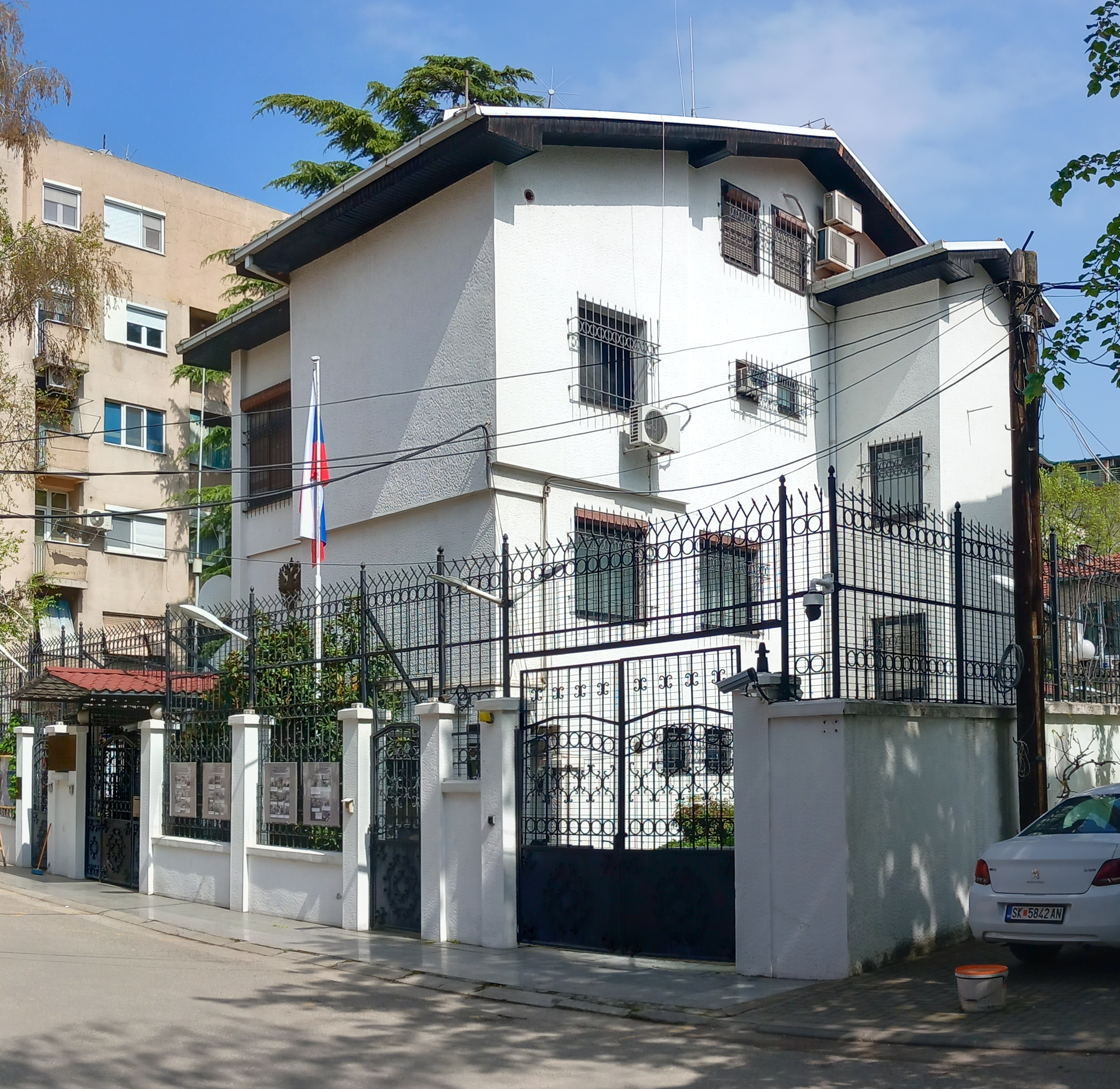
Embassy of Russia

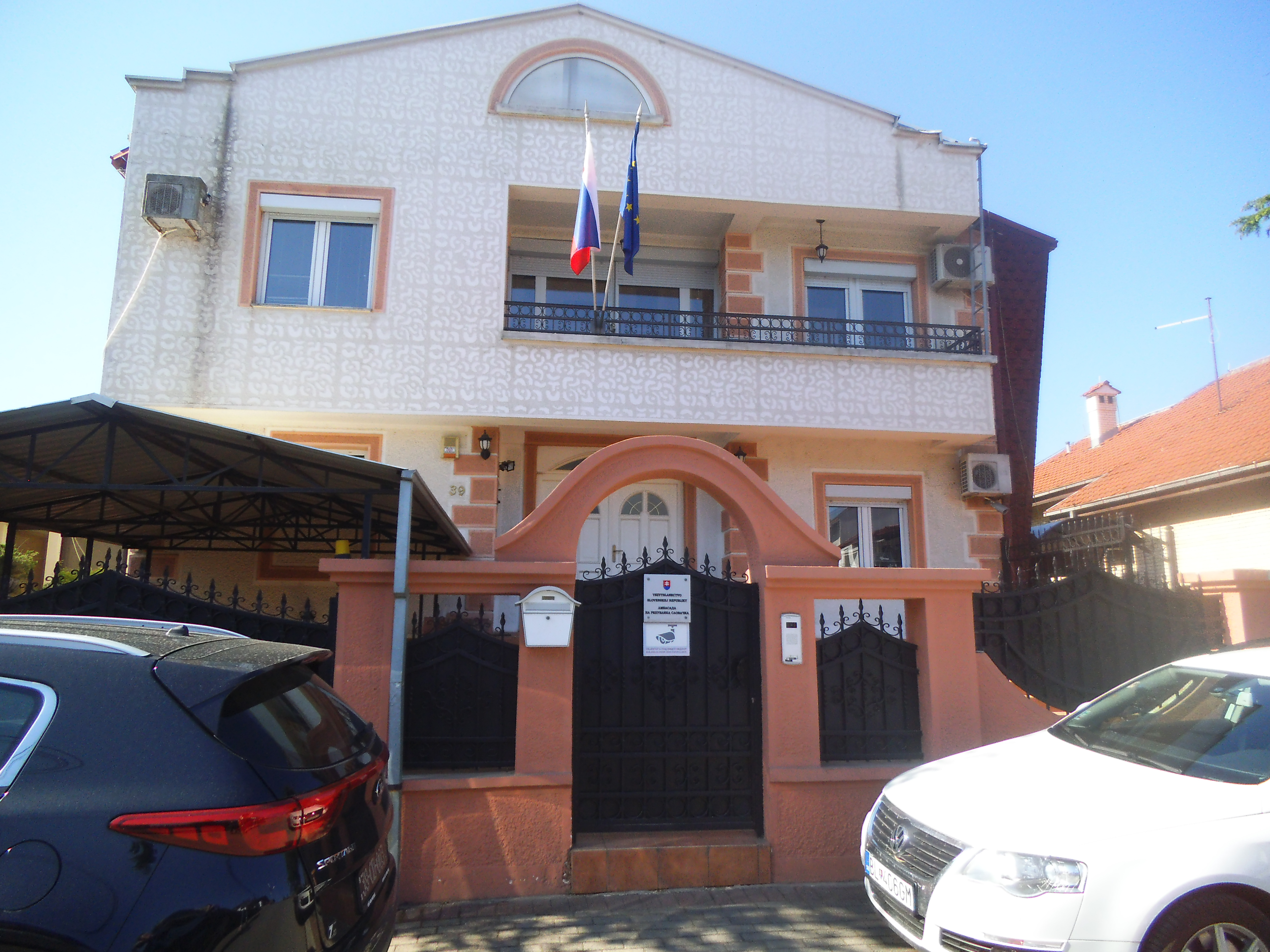
Embassy of Slovakia

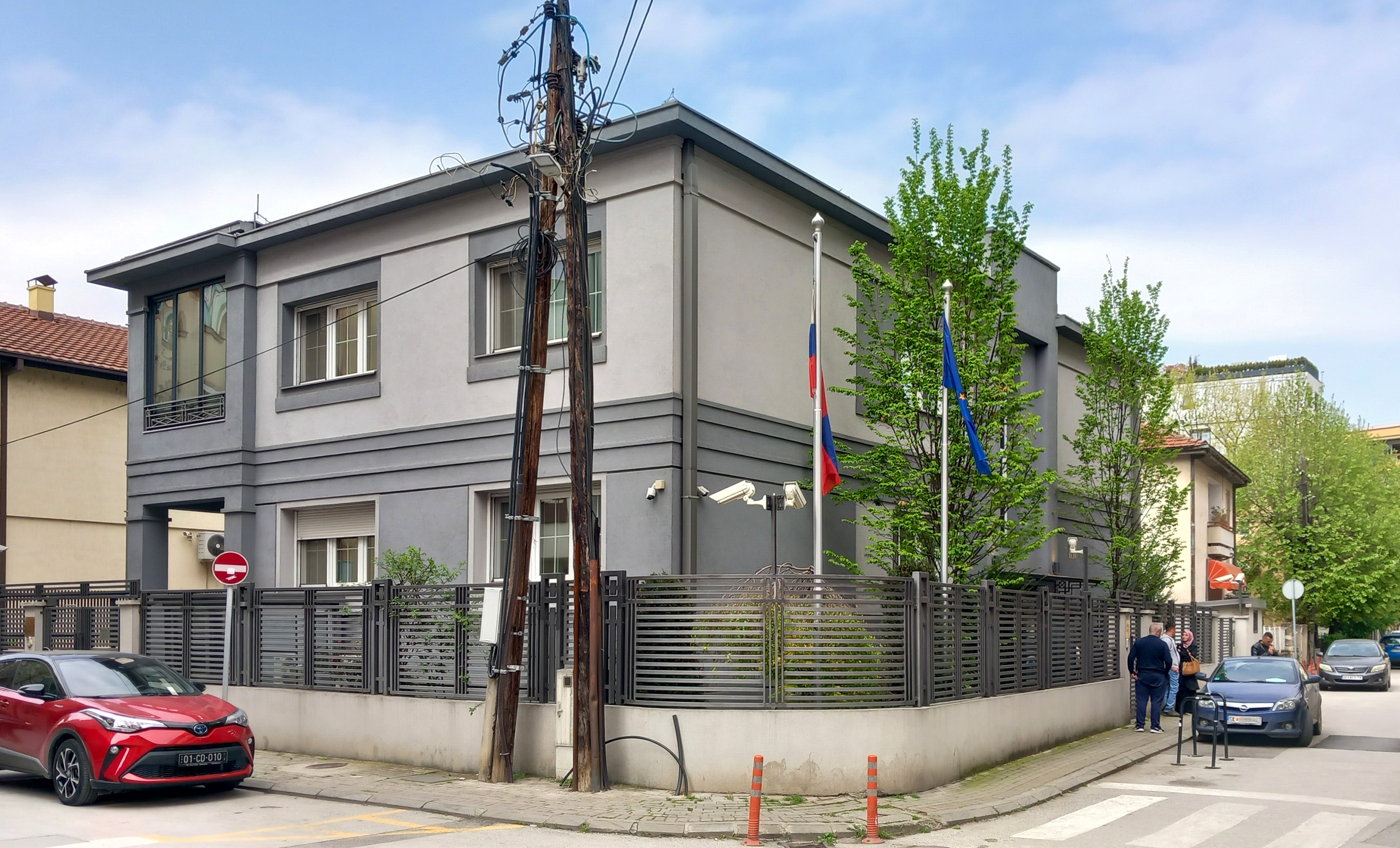
Embassy of Slovenia

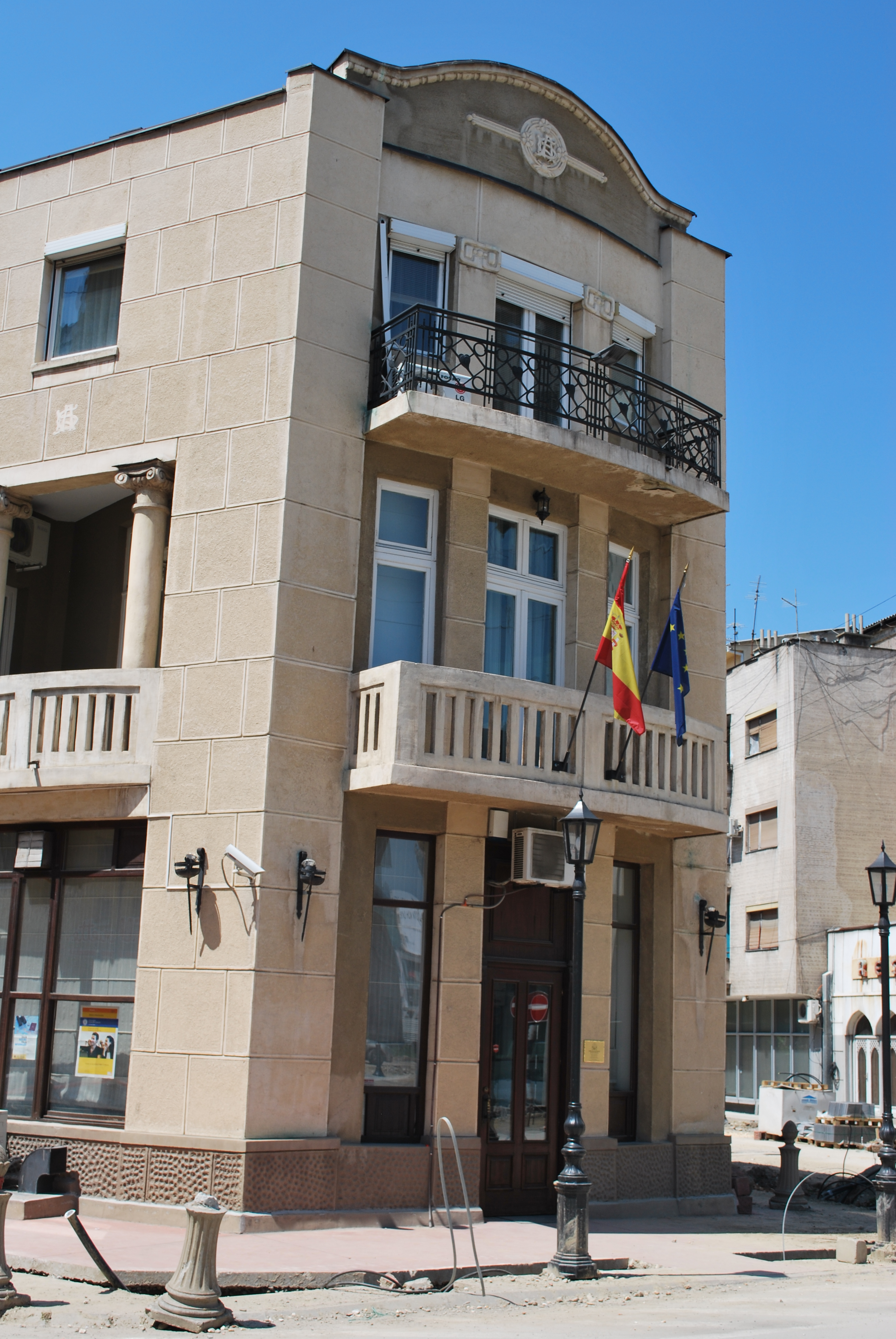
Embassy of Spain

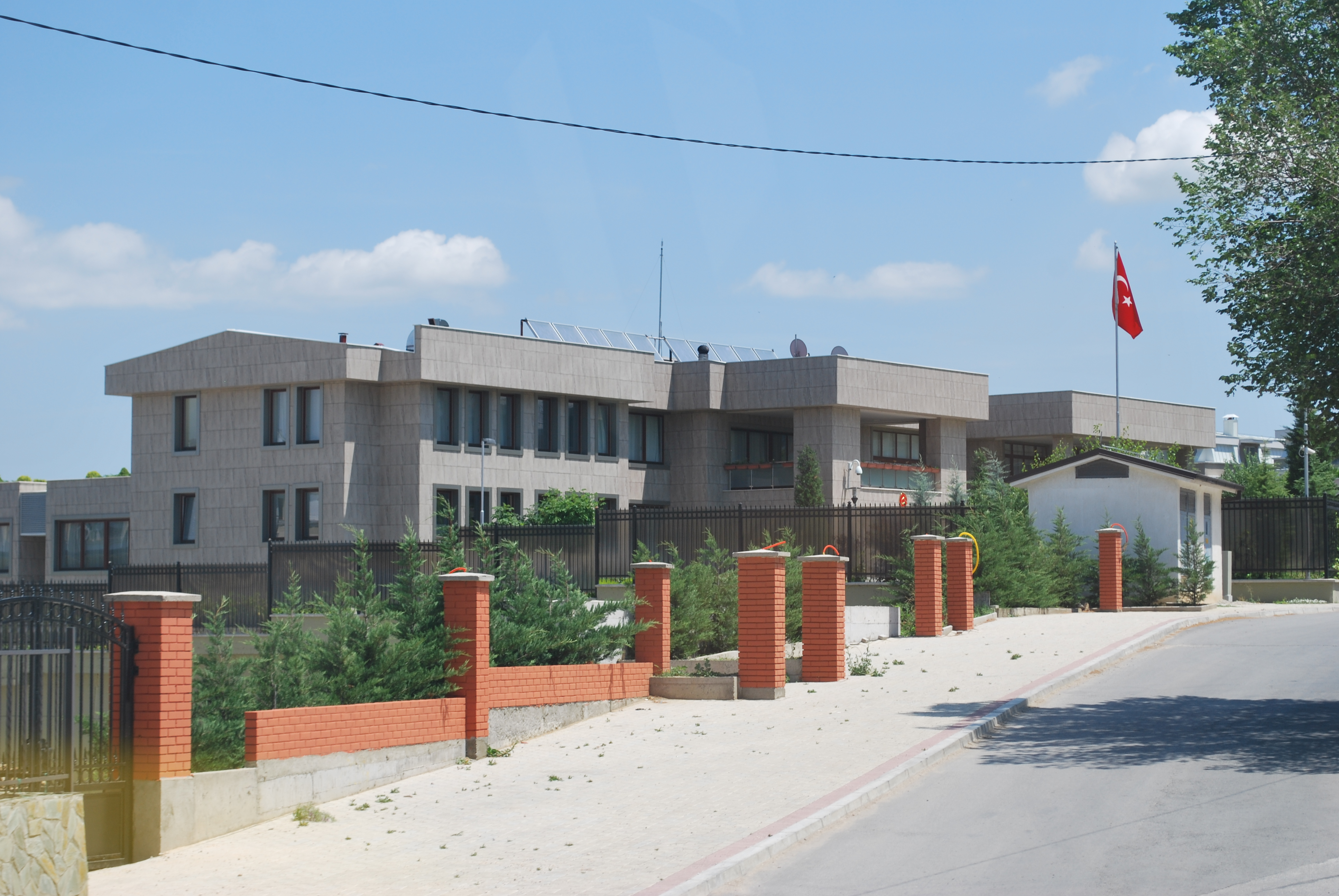
Embassy of Turkey

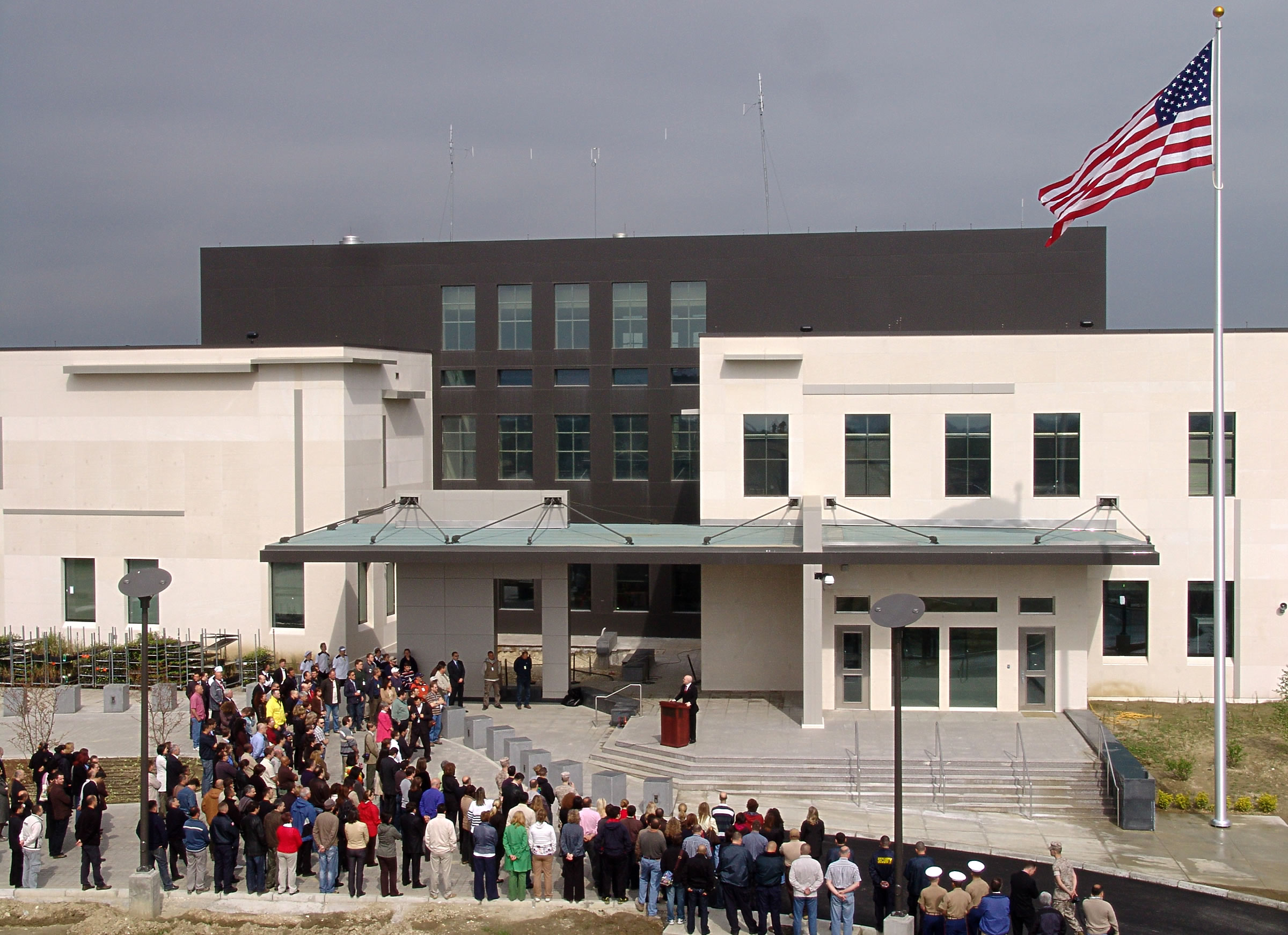
Embassy of the United States

== International organizations in North Macedonia ==
- United Nations — Rossana Dudziak
- United Nations Development Programme — Narine Sahakyan
- United Nations High Commissioner for Refugees — Monica Sandri
- United Nations Office for Project Services — Michela Telatin
- United Nations Children's Fund — Patrizia Di Giovanni
- International Organization for Migration — Peter Van Der Auweraert
- International Monetary Fund — Sebastian Sosa
- World Bank Group — Massimiliano Paolucci
- World Health Organization — Jihane Tawilah
- Migration, Asylum, Refugees Regional Initiative Regional Centre — Sasko Kocev
- Support Element- KFOR — Jean Marie-Rollinger
- OSCE — Clemens Koja
- International Centre for Migration Policy Development — Melita Gruevska Graham
- European Bank for Reconstruction and Development — Andi Aranitasi
- International Management Group — Argjent Karai
- Regional Environmental Center for Central and Eastern Europe — Milena Manova

== Consular missions ==
=== Bitola, Bitola Municipality ===
1. Bulgaria (Consulate-General)
2. Greece (Consulate-General)

=== Struga, Struga Municipality ===
1. Albania (Consulate-General)
2. Kosovo (Consulate-General)

== Planned embassies in the future ==
1. Australia
2. Belgium
3. South Korea
4. United Arab Emirates

== Non-resident embassies accredited to North Macedonia ==
=== Resident in Ankara, Turkey ===
1. Burkina Faso
2. El Salvador
3. Jordan
4. Kenya
5. Kyrgyzstan
6. Thailand
7. Zambia

=== Resident in Belgrade, Serbia ===
1. Angola
2. Australia
3. Azerbaijan
4. Belarus
5. Canada
6. Cyprus
7. Denmark
8. Finland
9. Libya
10. Mexico
11. Norway
12. Portugal
13. Syria
14. Tunisia

=== Resident in Berlin, Germany ===
1. Malawi
2. Sri Lanka
3. Togo

=== Resident in Bucharest, Romania ===
1. Algeria
2. Bangladesh
3. Ireland
4. Peru
5. Sudan
6. Uruguay
7. Venezuela

=== Resident in Budapest, Hungary ===
1. Colombia
2. Estonia
3. Laos
4. Malaysia

=== Resident in Rome, Italy ===
1. Ecuador
2. Equatorial Guinea
3. Ethiopia
4. Guinea
5. Lesotho
6. New Zealand
7. Panama
8. Paraguay
9. Sovereign Military Order of Malta
10. Tanzania
11. United Arab Emirates
12. Uganda

=== Resident in Sofia, Bulgaria ===
1. Argentina
2. Armenia
3. Belgium
4. Brazil
5. Cuba
6. Egypt
7. Georgia
8. Holy See
9. India
10. Indonesia
11. Iran
12. Kuwait
13. Moldova
14. Mongolia
15. Morocco
16. Pakistan
17. South Korea
18. Vietnam

=== Resident in other cities ===
1. Afghanistan (Athens)
2. Ghana (Prague)
3. Iceland (Reykjavík)
4. Israel (Zagreb)
5. Latvia (Prague)
6. Lithuania (Zagreb)
7. Luxembourg (Luxembourg City)
8. Malta (Valletta)
9. Namibia (Vienna)
10. Philippines (Athens)
11. San Marino (City of San Marino)
12. Saudi Arabia (Tirana)
13. Seychelles (Brussels)

== Closed missions ==
- Republic of China (Taiwan) (Closed in 2001)
- Norway (Closed in 2012) (Note: Resident in Belgrade, Serbia)
- Iran (Closed in 2020) (Note: Resident in Sofia, Bulgaria)

== See also ==
- List of diplomatic missions of North Macedonia
- List of diplomatic visits to North Macedonia
- Foreign relations of North Macedonia
