= Order of precedence in Albania =

Relative preeminence of officials for ceremonial purposes

The order of precedence (Albanian: radha e përparësisë) for public ceremonies in Albania is established by Vendim nr. 420, datë 8.6.2016 për miratimin e Ceremonialit Shtetëror të Republikës së Shqipërisë (Decision no. 420 of 8 June 2016 relating to the adoption of the state ceremony of the Republic of Albania). The original order has been modified several times since 2016, with the 2016 decision itself being a revision of the earlier protocol adopted in 2004. As of 22 November 2025 the order is as follows:

1. The President of the Republic (Bajram Begaj)
2. The Prime Minister (Edi Rama)
3. The Speaker of the Parliament (Niko Peleshi)
4. The President of the Constitutional Court (Holta Zaçaj)
5. The Deputy Speakers of the Parliament
6. The members of the Council of Ministers
7. The former Presidents of the Republic
8. The former Prime Ministers
9. Foreign ambassadors serving in Albania
10. The Leader of the Opposition
11. The leaders of the parliamentary groups, according to the group's representation in the Parliament
12. The chairpersons of the parliamentary commissions
13. The members of the Parliament
14. The Mayor of Tirana
15. The Chief Justice of Albania, officially known as the President of the Supreme Court of Albania
16. The President of the High Judicial Council
17. The President of the High Prosecutorial Council
18. The Director of SPAK
19. The Deputy Director of SPAK
20. The President of GJKKO (The Special Court against Corruption and Organized Crime)
21. The Deputy President of GJKKO
22. The President of the State Supreme Audit
23. The Prosecutor General
24. The Governor of the Bank of Albania
25. The Chief of the General Staff of the Albanian Armed Forces
26. The Ombudsperson (People's Advocate)
27. The Director of SHISH
28. The leaders of the religious communities
29. The members (justices) of the Constitutional Court
30. The Chairperson of the Special Appeals College
31. The members (justices) of the Supreme Court
32. The High Justice Inspector
33. The members of the High Judicial Council
34. The members of the High Prosecutorial Council
35. The members (prosecutors) of SPAK
36. The President of the Judicial Appointments Council (JAC)
37. The members of the JAC
38. The members (justices) of GJKKO
39. The Chairperson of the Independent Qualifications Commission (IQC)
40. The members of the IQC
41. The public commissioners
42. The Director of the School of Magistrates
43. The heirs of the Royal Family of Albania
44. The General Secretaries of the Office of the President, the Parliament, and the Council of Ministers
45. The deputy ministers
46. The General Secretary of the Ministry of Foreign Affairs.
47. The directors of the cabinets of the President of the Republic, the Prime Minister, and the Parliament
48. The Director of the State Protocol (chief of protocol)
49. Advisers to the President and to the Prime Minister
50. The Prefect of Tirana
51. Commanding officers of the Armed Forces with the rank of general
52. Leaders of political parties who are not serving as members of parliament
53. The State Advocate
54. The General Director of the State Police
55. The Director of the National Bureau of Investigation (BKH)
56. The Commanding Officer of the Republican Guard
57. People decorated with orders or medals
58. Chairperson of the Academy of Sciences
59. President of the Council of Rectors of the Republic
60. Career ambassadors
61. President of Tirana County
62. Leaders of the veterans' organizations of the National Liberation Movement
63. The Prefects
64. The Mayors
65. The President of the Tirana Appeals Court
66. The President of the Administrative Appeals Court
67. The President of the Serious Crimes Appeals Court
68. The presidents of the district appeals courts
69. The Director of Appeals Prosecution in Tirana
70. The Director of Serious Crimes Appeals Prosecution
71. The President of the Tirana First Instance Court
72. The President of the Tirana First Instance Administrative Court
73. The President of the Serious Crimes First Instance Court
74. The presidents of the district first instance courts
75. The presidents of the district first instance administrative courts
76. The rectors of universities
77. The Prosecutor of the Tirana Judicial Circuit
78. The district directors of prosecution

Of those ranked equally, the longest serving takes precedence, then the eldest. Foreigners take precedence over Albanian titleholders.
