= Prefect =

Magisterial title

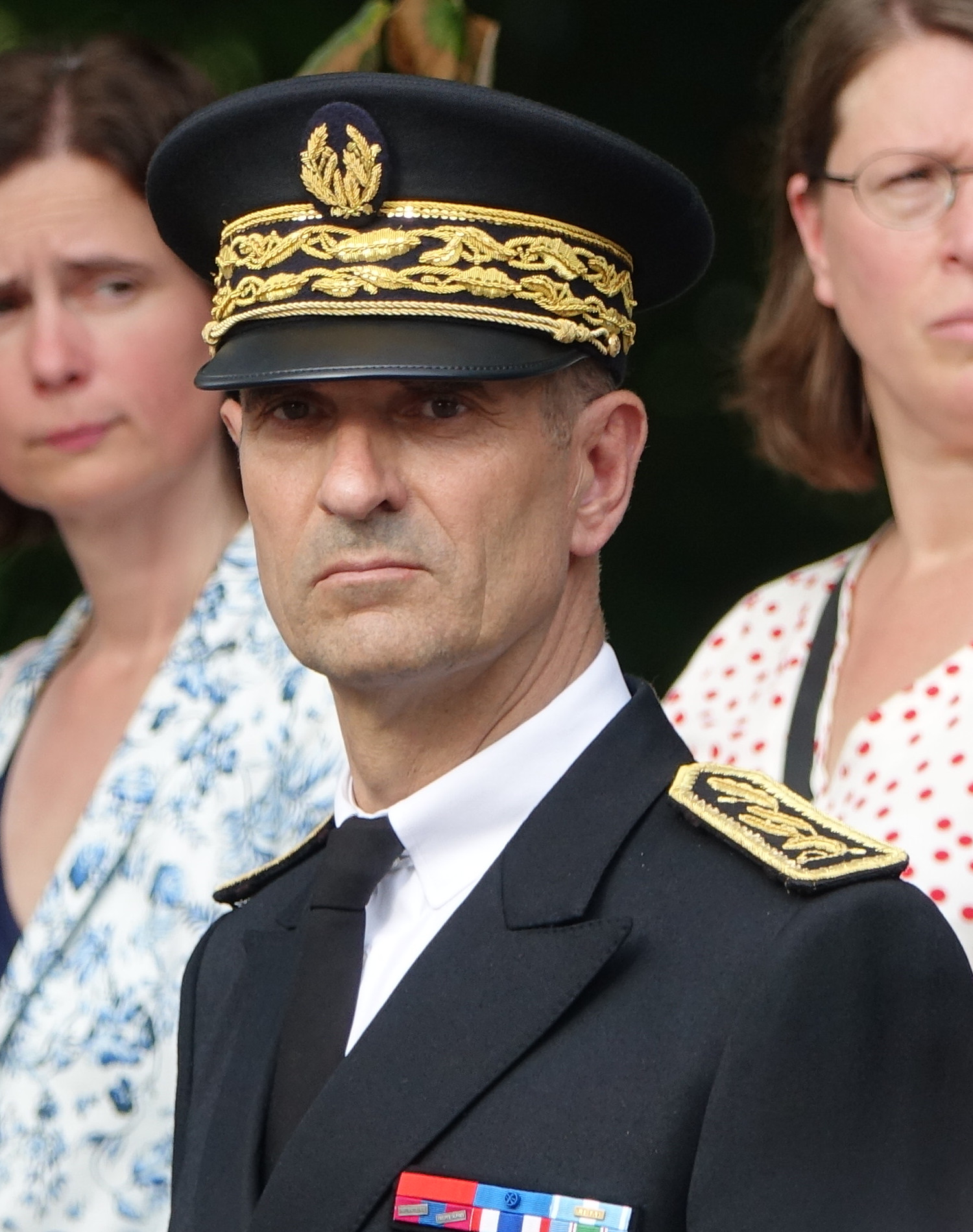
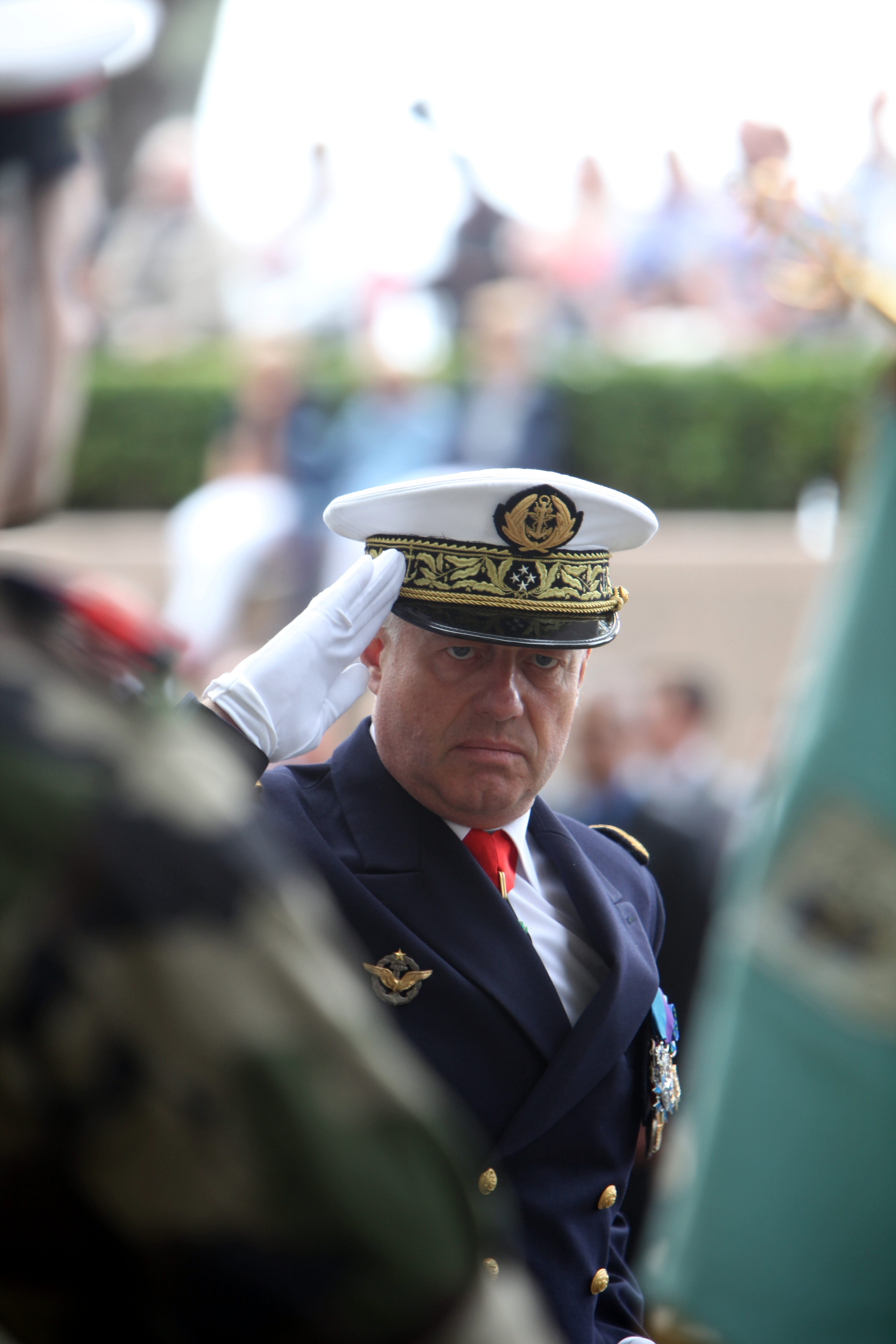
In France, a prefect (left) is the State's representative in a department. A maritime prefect (right) is a military officer who exercises authority at sea over a given area known as an arrondissement. In Paris, the police prefect exercises special powers under the authority of the Minister of the Interior.

Prefect (from the Latin praefectus, substantive adjectival form of praeficere: "put in front", meaning in charge) is a magisterial title of varying definition, but essentially refers to the leader of an administrative area.

A prefect's office, department, or area of control is called a prefecture, but in various post-Roman Empire cases there is a prefect without a prefecture or vice versa. The words "prefect" and "prefecture" are also used, more or less conventionally, to render analogous words in other languages, especially Romance languages.

== Ancient Rome ==
Praefectus was the formal title of many, fairly low to high-ranking officials in ancient Rome, whose authority was not embodied in their person (as it was with elected Magistrates) but conferred by delegation from a higher authority. They did have some authority in their prefecture such as controlling prisons and in civil administration.

== Feudal times ==
Especially in Medieval Latin, præfectus was used to refer to various officers—administrative, military, judicial, etc.—usually alongside a more precise term in the vernacular (such as Burggraf, which literally means Count of the Castle in the German language).

== Ecclesiastical ==
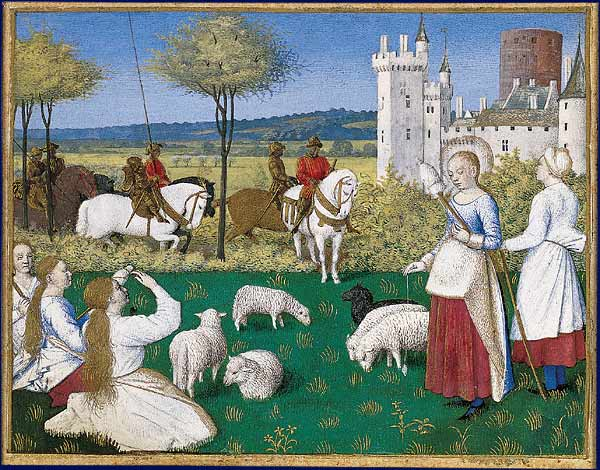
Saint Margaret attracts the attention of the Roman prefect, by Jean Fouquet from an illuminated manuscript

The term is used by the Catholic Church, which based much of its canon law terminology on Roman law, in several different ways.

- The Roman Curia has the nine Prefects for the Congregations as well as the two of the Papal Household and of the Economic Affairs of the Holy See.
- The title also attaches to the heads of some Pontifical Council (central departments of the Curia), who are principally titled president, but in addition there is sometimes an additional ex officio position as a prefect. For example, the president of the Pontifical Council for Interreligious Dialogue is also the prefect of the Commission for Religious Relations with Muslims.
- Traditionally these Curial officials are Cardinals, hence often called "Cardinal-Prefect" or "Cardinal-President". There was a custom that those who were not cardinals when they were appointed were titled "Pro-Prefect" or "Pro-President". Then these officials would be appointed prefect or president after their elevation to the Sacred College. However, since 1998, this custom has fallen into disuse.
- A Prefect Apostolic is a cleric (sometimes a Titular Bishop, but normally a priest) in charge of an apostolic prefecture, a type of Roman Catholic territorial jurisdiction fulfilling the functions of a diocese, usually in a missionary area or in a country that is anti-religious, such as the People's Republic of China, but that is not yet given the status of regular diocese. It is usually destined to become one in time.

== Modern sub-national administration ==
- In Albania a prefect (Prefekti) is the State's representative in a region (qark). His agency is called the Prefektura. Albania has 12 prefects in 12 prefectures, appointed by the Prime Minister of Albania and the Government.
- In France the prefect is a top-ranking public servant who belongs to the so-called Corps préfectoral. The function was created on 17 February 1800 by Napoleon Bonaparte after his successful coup d'état of 9 November 1799 which made him head of state with the title Premier Consul. The prefect's role at that time (until the reform of the function in the 1980s) was to be the top representative of the national government as well as the chief administrator in a department (which can be compared to a county in most English-speaking nations). The prefect's office is known as the prefecture (préfecture). Subprefects operate as assistants in the arrondissements (departmental subdivisions).
- In the Swiss canton of Vaud a prefect (préfet) is the representative of local authorities (districts) appointed by the president of the Council of State.

In the 1980s, under the presidency of François Mitterrand (1981–1995), a fundamental change in the role of the prefect (and subprefect) took place. The previously extremely centralized French Fifth Republic was gradually decentralized by the creation of administrative regions and the devolution of central state powers into regions, departments, and communes (municipalities). New elected authorities were created (e.g. the Conseils régionaux) in order to administer the subdivisional entities (collectivités territoriales) of the nation (law from 2 March 1982). The changes have gradually altered the function of the prefect, who is still the chief representative of the State in a department, but without the omnipotent function of chief administrator. Instead, the prefect has acquired the non-titular roles of chief controller of regional, departmental, and municipal public accounts, and of chief inspector of good (i.e. law-abiding) governance of the authorities of the respective territorial entities.

A préfet maritime (maritime prefect) is a French admiral (amiral) who is commissioned to be the chief commander of a zone maritime (i.e. a section of the French territorial waters and the respective shores).

In Paris, the préfet de police (prefect of police) is the head of the city's police under the direct authority of the Minister of the Interior, which makes him unique as usually in French towns and cities the chief of the local police is subordinate to the mayor, who is the local representative of the minister in police matters.

- In Italy, a prefect (prefetto) is a high-ranking public servant who belongs to the so-called Corpo prefettizio and is the State's representative in a province. His office is called Prefettura – Ufficio Territoriale del Governo. The prefects have political responsibility and coordinate the local head of the State Police (Questore), who has technical responsibility to enforce laws when public safety is threatened. Similar offices already existed under various names before Italian unification (1861) (e.g., in the Kingdom of Two Sicilies it was named "intendente"); in Northern Italy, it was imported from France during the Napoleonic occupation (1802). Its current form dates back to 1861, when the government of Bettino Ricasoli extended the Kingdom of Sardinia's administrative system to the entire country. In the early years the job entailed a more vigorous and vigilant application of central state authority, by enforcing regulations and dispositions in the fields of education, public works, public health, and the nomination of mayors and provincial deputies. He also plays the role of intermediary between the government and municipalities and other local governments.
- In some Spanish-speaking states in Latin America, following a French-type model introduced in Spain itself, prefects were installed as governors; remarkably, in some republics (like Peru) two levels were constructed from the French model: a prefecture and a department, the one being only part of the other.
- In Greece a prefect (nomarhis, νομάρχης) used to be the elected head of one of the 54 prefectures (nomarhies, νομαρχίες), which were second-level administrative divisions, between the first-level Peripheries (periferies, περιφέρειες) and the third-level Municipalities (demoi, δήμοι), until their abolition with the Kallikratis reform in 2010. The Prefectural elections (popular ballot) would be held every four years along with the Municipal elections. The last Prefectural elections in Greece were held in October 2006.
- In Romania, a prefect (prefect) is the appointed governmental representative in a county (județ) and in the Municipality of Bucharest, in an agency called prefectură. The prefect's role is to represent the national government at local level, acting as a liaison and facilitating the implementation of National Development Plans and governing programmes at local level.
- In Québec, a warden (French: préfet) is the head of a regional county municipality.
- In Brazil, a prefect (prefeito) is the elected head of the executive branch in a municipality. Larger cities, such as São Paulo, Rio de Janeiro, Curitiba, etc., also have sub-prefects, appointed to their offices by the elected prefect.
- In Georgia, the nation in the Caucasus region, a prefect (პრეფექტი) was the head of the executive branch in a municipality, appointed by the President of Georgia from 1990 to 1992.
- In Iran, a prefect (بخشدار) is responsible for the administration of a sector in Iran's political and administrative system.
- In China the leader of a prefecture is called an administration commissioner (行署专员). Leaders of leagues (the Inner Mongolian equivalent) are league leaders (盟长). Both are equivalent to prefects. But far more common is prefecture-level cities (municipalities are equivalent; there are no province above them), who have shizhang (市长) which are often misleadingly translated as mayors, but are always responsible for the full prefecture rather than just the urban districts or actual urban core, and are thus prefects, not mayors (unless no country-level division exists in the prefecture, such as Dongguan, in which case the officeholder is prefect-mayor). If the urban area belongs to only one urban district, the head of the district is the effective mayor, otherwise there is none (like Paris during the time of department of Seine). In all cases actual leadership is exercised through the party committee.

== Police ==
In Paris, the prefect of police (préfet de police) is the officer in charge of co-ordinating the city's police forces. The local police in Japan are divided among prefectures too.

In several countries of Latin America, the rank of prefect is still in use. In the Investigations Police of Chile (Policia de Investigaciones de Chile) the rank of prefect is reserved for the highest-ranking officers. Similarly, in Argentina the Argentine Federal Penitentiary Service (Servicio Penitenciario Argentino) also use the rank of prefect as a high-ranking officer.

== Coast guard ==
Several countries of Latin America use the term "prefecture" (prefectura) to denominate a coast guard service, whether these are independent organizations or as a part of a navy. The Argentine Naval Prefecture is a federal coast guard service of Argentina independent from the Argentine Navy. On the other hand, the National Naval Prefecture of Uruguay has similar duties to the ones of a regular coast guard but it is subordinated to the National Navy of Uruguay.

== See also ==
- Pauly-Wissowa
- Praefectus palatii
- Préfet

Similar office in pre-revolutionary France, Spain, and other countries:

- Intendant
- School prefect
