= List of diplomatic visits to North Macedonia =

This is a list of heads of state and heads of government who have visited North Macedonia.

Country	Name	Title	Date
Germany	Roman Herzog	President	September 9–10, 1996
France	Jacques Chirac	President	February 28, 1999
United Kingdom	Tony Blair	Prime Minister	May 3, 1999
Netherlands	Wim Kok	Prime Minister	May 25–26, 1999
USA	Bill Clinton	President	June 22, 1999
Germany	Gerhard Schröder	Prime Minister/Chancellor	July 23, 1999
Belgium	Albert II of Belgium	King	October 11, 2000
Denmark	Per Stig Møller	Prime Minister	April 1, 2002
Austria	Thomas Klestil	President	April 11, 2002
Belgium	Guy Verhofstadt	Prime Minister	May 6, 2002
Poland	Aleksander Kwaśniewski	President	October 2–3, 2002
France	Jean-Pierre Raffarin	Prime Minister	June 8, 2003
Hungary	Ferenc Mádl	President	August 27–28, 2003
Czech Republic	Vladimír Špidla	Prime Minister	March 16–17, 2004
Moldova	Vladimir Voronin	President	February 21–22, 2005
Croatia	Stjepan Mesić	President	October 23–24, 2006
Bulgaria	Georgi Parvanov	President	November 4, 2006
Hungary	Ferenc Gyurcsány	Prime Minister	November 23, 2006
Germany	Horst Köhler	President	April 17–18, 2008
Austria	Heinz Fischer	Prime Minister	July 12–13, 2007
Bulgaria	Sergei Stanishev	Prime Minister	December 14–15, 2008
Slovenia	Danilo Türk	President	February 17–18, 2009
Estonia	Toomas Hendrik Ilves	President	October 13–14, 2009
Belgium	Yves Leterme	Prime Minister	March 8, 2010
Romania	Traian Băsescu	President	May 27, 2010
Czech Republic	Václav Klaus	President	June 21–22, 2010
Latvia	Valdis Zatlers	President	July 14–15, 2010
Montenegro	Milo Đukanović	Prime Minister	October 22, 2010
Hungary	Viktor Orbán	Prime Minister	May 12, 2011
Turkey	Recep Tayyip Erdoğan	Prime Minister	September 29, 2011
Qatar	Hamad bin Khalifa Al Thani	Emir	October 17–18, 2011
Bosnia and Herzegovina	Željko Komšić	President of the presidency	October 24–25, 2011
Serbia	Boris Tadić	President	December 16–17, 2011
Montenegro	Filip Vujanović	President	March 16–17, 2012
Czech Republic	Petr Nečas	Prime Minister	April 16–17, 2012
Albania	Bamir Topi	President	April 19–20, 2012
United Nations	Ban Ki-moon	general secretary	July 24, 2012
Albania	Bujar Nishani	President	September 14, 2012
Serbia	Tomislav Nikolić	President	October 26–28, 2012
Bulgaria	Boyko Borisov	Prime Minister	February 16, 2013
Slovenia	Borut Pahor	President	July 16–17, 2013
Poland	Bronisław Komorowski	President	September 10–11, 2013
Albania	Edi Rama	Prime Minister	September 10–11, 2013
Hungary	Viktor Orbán	Prime Minister	December 5, 2013
Croatia	Zoran Milanović	Prime Minister	September 9, 2014
Vietnam	Nguyễn Thị Doan	Vice President	November 2, 2014
Turkey	Ahmet Davutoğlu	Prime Minister	December 22–23, 2014
Holy See	Pietro Parolin	Secretary of State	March 18–19, 2016
Czech Republic	Miloš Zeman	President	June 9–10, 2016
Bosnia and Herzegovina	Mladen Ivanić	President of the Presidency	April 19–20, 2017
Bulgaria	Boyko Borisov	Prime Minister	August 1–2, 2017
Montenegro	Duško Marković	Prime Minister	October 16, 2017
Albania	Ilir Meta	President	November 20–21, 2017
Bulgaria	Rumen Radev	President	February 16–17, 2018
Bosnia and Herzegovina	Denis Zvizdić	Chairman of the Council of Ministers	March 12, 2018
Slovenia	Miro Cerar	Prime Minister	April 3–4, 2018
Croatia	Kolinda Grabar-Kitarović	President	April 26–27, 2018
United Kingdom	Theresa May	Prime Minister	May 17, 2018
Romania	Viorica Dăncilă	Prime Minister	July 27, 2018
Austria	Sebastian Kurz	Chancellor	September 7, 2018
Germany	Angela Merkel	Chancellor	September 8, 2018
Malta	Joseph Muscat	Prime Minister	November 14, 2018
Greece	Alexis Tsipras	Prime Minister	April 2, 2019
Holy See	Francis	Pope	May 7, 2019
Serbia	Ana Brnabic	Prime Minister	August 26, 2019
Montenegro	Milo Đukanović	President	October 2–03, 2019
Kosovo	Albin Kurti	Prime Minister	November 4, 2019
Slovenia	Borut Pahor	President	September 25, 2020
Kosovo	Avdullah Hoti	Prime Minister	October 23, 2020
Georgia	Salome Zurabishvili	President	May 10, 2021
Czech Republic	Lubomír Metnar	Minister of Defense	May 11–12, 2021
Kosovo	Albin Kurti	Prime Minister	September 16, 2021
Netherlands	Mark Rutte	Prime Minister	November 11, 2021
Poland	Andrzej Duda	President	November 18–19, 2021
Bulgaria	Kiril Petkov	Prime Minister	January 18, 2022
Germany	Olaf Scholz	Chancellor	June 11, 2022
Kosovo	Vjosa Osmani	President	June 16–17, 2022
Spain	Pedro Sánchez	Prime Minister	July 31, 2022
Germany	Frank-Walter Steinmeier	President	November 29–30, 2022
Kosovo	Albin Kurti	Prime Minister	March 18, 2023
Serbia	Aleksandar Vučić	President	March 18, 2023
Croatia	Andrej Plenković	Prime Minister	April 5, 2023
Kosovo	Vjosa Osmani	President	April 26, 2023
Albania	Bajram Begaj	President	June 15–16, 2023
Albania	Bajram Begaj	President	September 11, 2023
Bosnia and Herzegovina	Željko Komšić	Chairman of the Presidency	September 11, 2023
Bosnia and Herzegovina	Denis Bećirović, Željka Cvijanović	Member of the Presidency	September 11, 2023
Croatia	Zoran Milanović	President	September 11, 2023
Kosovo	Vjosa Osmani	President	September 11, 2023
Montenegro	Jakov Milatović	President	September 11, 2023
Serbia	Aleksandar Vučić	President	September 11, 2023
Slovenia	Nataša Pirc Musar	President	September 11, 2023
Albania	Edi Rama	Prime Minister	November 22, 2023
Croatia	Zoran Milanović	President	November 22, 2023
Montenegro	Milojko Spajic	Prime Minister	November 22, 2023
Albania	Edi Rama	Prime Minister	January 21–22, 2024
Kosovo	Albin Kurti	Prime Minister	January 21–22, 2024
Montenegro	Milojko Spajic	Prime Minister	January 21–22, 2024
Albania	Bajram Begaj	President	June 13, 2024
Kosovo	Vjosa Osmani	President	June 13, 2024
Montenegro	Jakov Milatović	President	March 31, 2026
