= List of international presidential trips made by Bajram Begaj =

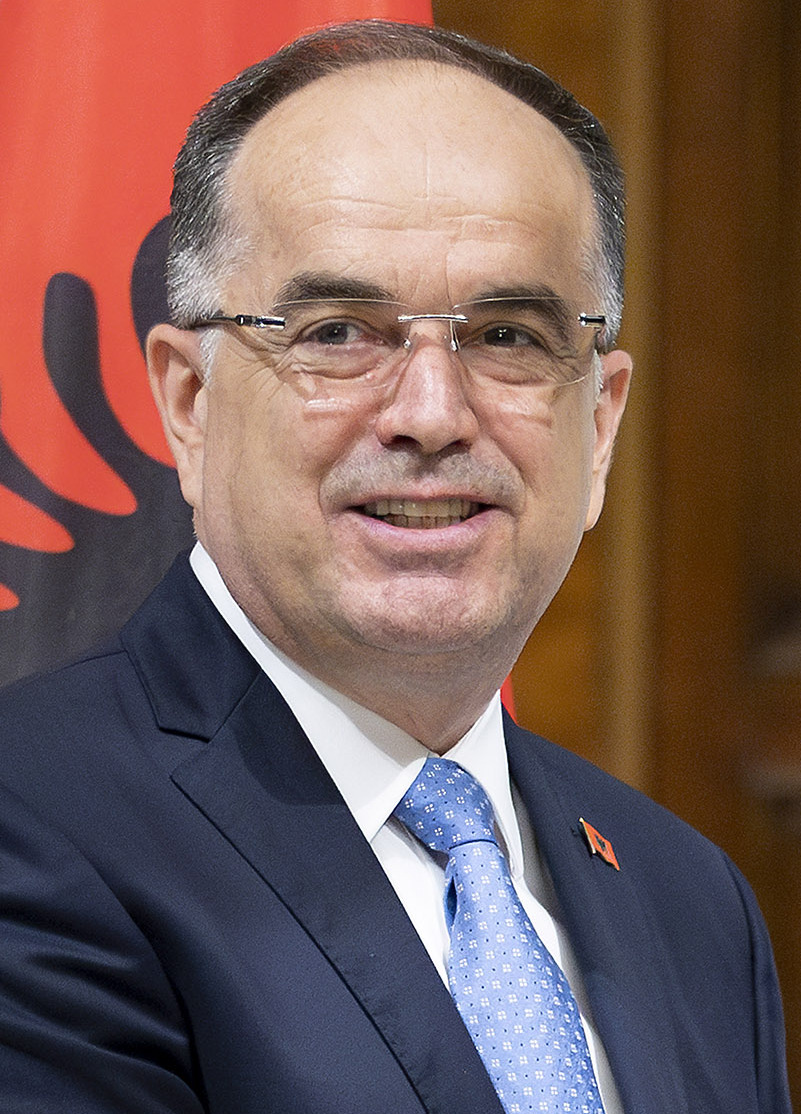
Bajram Begaj is the incumbent president of Albania since his inauguration on 24 July 2022.

Since 24 July 2022, Bajram Begaj has served as the incumbent president of Albania. Prior to his presidency, President Begaj had a distinguished career in both military and medical fields, culminating in his promotion to major general as the 26th Chief of General Staff of the Albanian Armed Forces. The president has articulated his commitment to advancing the interests of the Albanians and furthering the Euro-Atlantic aspirations of all Albanians, as well as those in adjacent Albanian-speaking territories. His tenure is marked by a dedication to upholding the Albanian constitution, safeguarding the rights and freedoms of the Albanians, and promoting national sovereignty and prosperity, while fostering international relations and enhancing the nation's Euro-Atlantic integration.

As of 3 December 2024, President Begaj has conducted a series of diplomatic engagements across various nations, underscoring his commitment to enhancing the international relations of Albania. There has been one trip each to Belgium, Bosnia and Herzegovina, Bulgaria, Croatia, Estonia, Germany, Kazakhstan, Latvia, Lithuania, Poland, the Sovereign Military Order of Malta, Switzerland, and the United States. Furthermore, two trips were made to Slovenia, the United Kingdom, and Vatican City. Three trips were executed to Azerbaijan, Montenegro, and North Macedonia, with five trips made to Italy. The most significant interactions occurred with Kosovo characterised by seven diplomatic engagements.

== 2022 ==
Country	Areas visited	Dates	Details	Ref.
KOS	Prekaz, Pristina, Prizren	15–16 August	President Begaj embarked on a two-day state visit to Kosovo at the invitation of President Vjosa Osmani, representing Begaj's inaugural diplomatic engagement since assuming the office on 24 July 2022. A significant component of the agenda involved a tribute at the memorial dedicated to individuals who remain missing as a consequence of the Kosovo War. In addition, Begaj paid homage to the memory of notable figures by visiting the gravesite of Ibrahim Rugova, alongside the graves and museum honoring the Jashari family in Prekaz. The engagement also facilitated high-level consultations with prominent political figures, including discussions with Prime Minister Albin Kurti and Speaker of the Parliament Glauk Konjufca. Furthermore, Begaj met with the heads of political parties, the commander of KFOR, and personnel from the Albanian Armed Forces deployed within KFOR, concluding with an exploration of the League of Prizren complex in Prizren.	
SLO	Kranj	12 September	President Begaj attended the 11th summit of the Brdo-Brijuni Process held in Kranj, Slovenia, alongside other heads of state from the Western Balkans. In his address, Begaj acknowledged the paramount importance of accelerating the European Union's (EU) enlargement process amidst geopolitical challenges, particularly the ramifications of Russia's invasion of Ukraine. Furthermore, he highlighted the need for a renewed approach from the EU to the region, citing the 2022 cyberattacks in Albania and the nation's transformative reforms.	
GBR	London	18 September	President Begaj, accompanied by First Lady Armanda Begaj, attended the state funeral of Queen Elizabeth II in London, the United Kingdom, at the invitation of Charles III.	
VAT	Vatican City	2 December	Pope Francis held an audience with President Begaj in Vatican City, marking the latter's status as the eighth Albanian president to engage with the Pope. The engagement reaffirmed the strong bilateral relations between Albania and the Holy See and referenced the pastoral visit to Tirana in 2014. The dialogues addressed the significant contributions of the Albanian Catholic community, particularly during the era of persecution under the communist regime, and the martyrs of the Albanian Catholic Church, alongside the enduring legacy of the Albanian nun, Mother Teresa.	

== 2023 ==
Country	Areas visited	Dates	Details	Ref.
KOS	Pristina	16–17 February	President Begaj participated in the commemoration of the 15th anniversary of the independence of Kosovo in Pristina. During the two-day state visit, Begaj attended a solemn ceremony in the Parliament of Kosovo, alongside President Osmani and Prime Minister Kurti. Further, he articulated that Albanians constitute a nation that has confronted the region's challenging historical circumstances with dignity and has made significant contributions to peace in both the regional context and Europe, despite the divisions imposed by borders.	
BEL	Brussels	7 March	NATO Secretary General Jens Stoltenberg convened with President Begaj at NATO Headquarters in Brussels to discuss Albania's contributions to the alliance. Stoltenberg commended Albania for its involvement in multinational forces in Latvia and Bulgaria, its peacekeeping missions in Kosovo and Iraq, and its rapid response to the earthquake in Turkey. The dialogue highlighted the importance of NATO's role in the Western Balkans and emphasised continued cooperation for regional stability.	
AZE	Baku	11–13 March	President Begaj undertook a working visit to Baku, Azerbaijan, to participate in the 10th summit of the Global Baku Forum. During this engagement, Begaj held discussions with President Ilham Aliyev regarding the enhancement of bilateral relations, with particularly in the energy and tourism sectors. He also addressed recent developments, including the abolition of visa requirements and the establishment of a joint cooperation committee. In this context, he highlighted Albania's strategic potential as a regional hub for gas distribution and extended an invitation to both state and private enterprises to explore investment opportunities in Albania.	
CRO	Zadar, Zagreb	26–27 April	President Begaj commenced a two-day state visit to Croatia, during which he engaged in discussions with President Zoran Milanović concerning bilateral relations and the geopolitical dynamics in Southeast Europe. A principal focus of their dialogue was Albania's EU accession, particularly in light of the formal initiation of EU membership negotiations. Begaj also meet with Speaker of the Parliament Gordan Jandroković and the Prime Minister Andrej Plenković. Furthermore, the two presidents traveled to Zadar, where they met with local officials, including the President of the Zadar City Council and representatives of the Albanian national minority.	
GBR	London	6 May	President Begaj, accompanied by First Lady Armanda Begaj, participated in the coronation of King Charles III and Queen Camilla in London, the United Kingdom.	
MNE	Podgorica, Tuzi	20 May	President Begaj attended the inauguration of President Jakov Milatović in Podgorica, Montenegro. During his one-day state visit, Begaj addressed representatives of the Albanian community of Montenegro in Tuzi.	
ITA	Rome	26–27 May	President Begaj commenced a two-day state visit to Italy, where he was received by President Sergio Mattarella. In their discussions, Begaj articulated the historical bilateral relationship, commending Italy's critical contributions to Albania's democratic advancement over the past decades, as well as its sustained support for Albania's EU integration efforts. Notably, he underscored the significance of the Arbëreshë community, wherein he proposed collaborative initiatives aimed at promoting Arbëreshë traditions within UNESCO. The engagement concluded with a commitment to addressing various regional challenges, including the facilitation of Kosovo's international integration.	
KOS	Prizren	10 June	President Begaj participated in the ceremonies commemorating the 145th anniversary of the League of Prizren, alongside integral political figures including President Osmani and Prime Minister Kurti. Begaj highlighted the League's crucial role in fostering national consciousness and unity among Albanians, emphasising that the development and empowerment of the Albanian people across their territories remain a collective mission. He further called for cooperative efforts towards integration into the Euro-Atlantic family, stressing the importance of preserving shared language and culture as well as maintaining strong strategic partnerships.	
MKD	Struga	15–16 June	President Begaj participated in the 3rd edition of the Prespa Forum for Dialogue in Struga, North Macedonia, where he joined a panel moderated by President Stevo Pendarovski. In his discourse, Begaj asserted that fostering cooperation and mutual understanding among the nations of the Balkans was essential for transforming past conflicts into valuable lessons for future collaboration.	
MNE	Podgorica	27 June	President Begaj attended the South-East European Cooperation Process (SEECP) summit held in Podgorica, Montenegro, together with other heads of state from Southeast Europe. Begaj underscored the shared challenges faced by societies in the region, advocating for a collaborative commitment to address these issues.	
AZE	Baku	7 July	President Begaj was received by President Aliyev during a state visit to Azerbaijan. The two presidents engaged in dialogues centered on bilateral cooperation, particularly concerning the development of a modern gasification network in Albania and regional gas distribution projects. Begaj highlighted Albania's role as a gas transit nation and its strategic significance following the Trans Adriatic Pipeline (TAP) project.	
SLO	Ljubljana	13 July	President Begaj was welcomed at the invitation of President Nataša Pirc Musar. Begaj recognised Slovenia as a pivotal regional and European partner, expressing gratitude for its continuous advocacy of Albania's EU accession strategy and the broader initiative for the enlargement of the Western Balkans. Nevertheless, the discussions encompassed matters concerning the integration of the Albanian community in Slovenia, cooperation across various sectors, along with Slovenia's assistance following the 2019 earthquake in Albania.	
KAZ	Astana	6–8 September	President Begaj, accompanied by First Lady Armanda Begaj, undertook a two-day state visit to Kazakhstan, representing the inaugural visit by an Albanian president to the nation, coinciding with the 30th anniversary of their diplomatic relations. During this visit, Begaj engaged in discussions with President Kassym-Jomart Tokayev, focusing on the enhancement of bilateral relations. Decisive agreements emerged, including the establishment of a Kazakh embassy in Albania, initiatives to launch direct flights, and the expansion of visa exemption policies.	
MKD	Skopje	11 September	President Begaj participated in the 12th summit of the Brdo-Brijuni Process held in Skopje, North Macedonia, together with other heads of state from the Western Balkans. He denoted the shared challenges of EU integration, youth issues, emigration, and climate change, and engaged in bilateral discussions with leaders from Bosnia and Herzegovina, Montenegro, and North Macedonia to enhance relations and promote an inclusive regional agenda.	
USA	New York City	17–23 September	President Begaj participated in the 78th session of the United Nations General Assembly (UNGA). At the conclusion of the assembly, Begaj was expected to adopt a political declaration reaffirming their commitments to achieving the 2030 Agenda for Sustainable Development.	
ITA	Rome	26 September	President Begaj attended the state funeral of President Giorgio Napolitano in Rome.	
ITA	Carfizzi, Pallagorio and San Nicola dell'Alto	21–23 October	President Begaj conducted a visit to the Arbëreshë community in Calabria, Italy, accompanied by First Lady Armanda Begaj. The delegation was received by local authorities and community representatives in Pallagorio, and subsequently visited additional Arbëresh settlements, including Carfizzi and San Nicola dell'Alto. This engagement marked the 30th anniversary of diplomatic relations between Albania and Italy. Begaj underscored the linkages between the two nations, articulating appreciation for the integration of the Arbëresh people into Italian society and their contributions to the broader cultural landscape.	
BUL	Sofia	14 December	President Begaj conducted a state visit to Bulgaria at the invitation of President Rumen Radev, commemorating the 110th anniversary of their diplomatic relations. The dialogue focused on deepening cooperation, the progress of EU enlargement, and regional collaboration in the context of NATO security. Begaj highlighted the strategic importance of the Pan-European Corridor VIII project and acknowledged Bulgaria's contributions to KFOR in Kosovo.	
KOS	Peja	30 December	President Begaj visited Albanian troops stationed at Camp Villagio Italia in Peja, Kosovo, where he extended New Year greetings to the servicemen. He met with Colonel Gabriele Vacca, the base commander, commending KFOR as a successful model for maintaining peace and security in the region. Begaj expressed gratitude to Italy for its leadership of the base and reaffirmed Albania's commitment to regional peace and security.	

== 2024 ==
Country	Areas visited	Dates	Details	Ref.
AZE	Baku	13–14 March	President Begaj embarked on a working visit to Baku, Azerbaijan, to attend the 11th summit of the Global Baku Forum. During this engagement, Begaj reaffirmed Albania's commitment to Euro-Atlantic integration, underscoring its status as a steadfast NATO ally and an EU candidate nation. Throughout his visit, he engaged in bilateral discussions with President Aliyev and Prime Minister Ali Asadov, concentrating on the enhancement of relations and acknowledging recent developments, including the establishment of a Joint Albania-Azerbaijan Committee.	
KOS	Pristina	15 April	President Begaj participated in the Women, Peace and Security Forum organised in Pristina, Kosovo, by President Osmani. In his address, Begaj commended Kosovo's international commitment to enhancing the role of women, advancing gender equality, and addressing a range of societal challenges. He characterised the forum as both a remembrance of historical and ongoing violence against women and a collective aspiration for a future strengthened by women's leadership. Additionally, he acknowledged the significant contributions of Albanian women in leadership positions and congratulated Kosovo on the election of two women to high office during its period of independence.	
(Sovereign Military Order of Malta) SMOM	Rome	19 April	President Begaj visited the Sovereign Order of Malta in Rome, Italy, to commemorate the 30th anniversary of diplomatic relations. Welcomed by Grand Master John T. Dunlap, Begaj applauded the Order's humanitarian efforts, particularly in northern Albania, where volunteers provide essential primary healthcare in remote mountainous areas. Initiatives endorsed by the Order's embassy in Tirana include social and educational integration of Roma communities, food distribution to disadvantaged families, and assistance for isolated elderly individuals. Begaj further expressed gratitude for the Order's historical support during the Kosovo conflict and encouraged ongoing efforts toward international recognition of Kosovo.	
ITA	Pallagorio, Torre Melissa	3 May	President Begaj visited Pallagorio, where he was honored with the title of "Citizen of Honor" by the Arbëreshë community. This distinction was unanimously awarded by the municipal council, led by Mayor Umberto Lorecchio, in recognition of his efforts to strengthen ties between the Arbëreshë and Albania. In his remarks, Begaj expressed deep gratitude and reaffirmed his commitment to advancing relations and supporting initiatives that celebrate Arbëreshë heritage. Additionally, he met with Deputy Prime Minister Antonio Tajani in Torre Melissa to discuss the substantial progress in bilateral relations. Their meeting coincided with commemorations honoring the centenary of the death of Anselmo Lorecchio.	
VAT	Vatican City	6 May	President Begaj was received in a private audience by Pope Francis, marking their second meeting since December 2022. He expressed gratitude for the Pope's messages of peace and calls to end armed conflicts, particularly in Ukraine and the Middle East, reaffirming Albania's commitment to dialogue as essential for sustainable development in the Balkans. As a goodwill gesture, he presented the Pope with a painting of the Church of Rubik, a particular site of Christianity in Albania. Additionally, Begaj discussed Albania's EU accession with the Cardinal Secretary of State Pietro Parolin and updated him on Kosovo's reforms in legal and minority rights, emphasising ongoing cooperation with the Holy See and the Catholic Church in Albania and Kosovo.	
KOS	Pristina	12 June	President Begaj attended a military parade in Pristina to commemorate the 25th anniversary of Kosovo's liberation, where he observed the Kosovo Police and the Kosovo Security Force. Following the parade, Begaj engaged in discussions with Prime Minister Kurti regarding shared accomplishments, including the recent ALPEX scholarship initiative. They underscored the significance of the Pristina-Durrës railway project, which Kurti termed the most fundamental initiative of the decade. The conversation also highlighted the ongoing enhancement of intergovernmental cooperation, exemplified by the inauguration of special border crossing corridors and the opening of 20 additional crossings for residents of the border region.	
MKD	Skopje	13 June	President Begaj participated in the South-East European Cooperation Process (SEECP) summit held in Skopje, North Macedonia, alongside other heads of state from Southeast Europe. He was welcomed by Prime Minister Talat Xhaferi, during which they underscored the significant contributions of the Albanian community of North Macedonia, commenting the necessity of intergovernmental and intercommunal collaboration for regional stability. Begaj characterised the relationship between the nations as exemplary and advocated for its extension into areas of mutual interest, emphasising the urgency of advancing both nations' integration into the EU.	
SUI	Lucerne	15–16 June	President Begaj attended the June 2024 Ukraine peace summit alongside other global heads of state in Lucerne, Switzerland.	
GER	Berlin	19 June	At the invitation of President Frank-Walter Steinmeier, President Begaj was received in Berlin, Germany, where Steinmeier reaffirmed Germany's commitment to supporting Albania's EU membership aspirations, underscoring the necessity of implementing further reforms to advance this objective.	
KOS	Deçan, Drenas, Junik	23 June	President Begaj undertook a two-day state visit to Kosovo, during which he engaged with three municipalities, including Deçan, Drenas, and Junik. Throughout this visit, Begaj paid tribute to the fallen veterans of the Kosovo Liberation Army and honored their memory at the Memorial Complex for Martyrs in Gllogjan. The municipality of Drenas conferred upon him the title of "Honorary Citizen," a distinction that followed a similar honor awarded to him by the municipality of Deçan.	
POL	Warsaw	2 July	During a state visit to Poland at the invitation of President Andrzej Duda, President Begaj convened in a bilateral meeting with his counterpart and their respective delegations. The discourse primarily focused on the enhancement of bilateral relations and the exploration of cooperative initiatives in light of regional dynamics and global challenges. He also articulated profound appreciation for Poland's steadfast support of Albania's aspirations for EU integration and acknowledged its significant contributions to international security efforts, particularly pertaining to the KFOR mission in Kosovo.	
LAT	Riga	3-4 September	President Begaj, accompanied by First Lady Armanda Begaj, conducted a historic state visit to Latvia, representing the inaugural engagement of an Albanian president with the Baltic nations. During his visit, Begaj conferred with President Edgars Rinkēvičs, underscoring the significance of augmenting political dialogue between the two nations. The discussions focused on bolstering bilateral cooperation across multiple sectors, notably the proposal for a permanent direct flight to enhance tourism and trade connectivity between Albania and Latvia. Additionally, he expressed gratitude for Latvia's support of Albania's EU accession efforts, while also addressing regional security challenges and reaffirming their mutual commitment to collaboration within NATO.	
EST	Tallinn	5 September	President Begaj traveled to Estonia as part of his broader state visits to the Baltic region. Upon arrival, he was welcomed by President Alar Karis, with whom he conducted a bilateral meeting that prioritised the enhancement of relations between their respective nations. A key focus of their discussions was the proposal to establish a permanent direct flight route between Tallinn and Tirana, aimed at facilitating greater connectivity. Additionally, Begaj engaged with Minister of Defence Hanno Pevkur, aligning their objectives in accordance with NATO initiatives. He expressed profound appreciation for Estonia's collaborative efforts in the domain of cybersecurity, particularly in light of the significant cyberattack that occurred in 2022.	
LTU	Vilnius	9 September	During his concluding state visit to Lithuania, President Begaj engaged in discussions with President Gitanas Nausėda, focusing on enhancing cooperation, Albania's EU membership, and support for Kosovo amid global challenges. In addition, Begaj conferred with Prime Minister Ingrida Šimonytė, Speaker of the Parliament Viktorija Čmilytė-Nielsen, and members of the Lithuania-Western Balkans Friendship Group. A significant outcome of the visit was the announcement of a new direct flight route between Vilnius and Tirana. Both leaders reiterated their commitment to security collaboration, with Begaj expressing gratitude for Lithuania's support in Albania's EU integration and support for Kosovo's Euro-Atlantic ambitions.	
MNE	Tivat	7 October	President Begaj attended the 13th summit of the Brdo-Brijuni Process held in Tivat, Montenegro, alongside other heads of state from the Western Balkans. Begaj engaged with representatives of the Albanian community in Montenegro, indicating the need for unity on national issues and advocating for collective Euro-Atlantic efforts. He condemned anti-Albanian actions, asserting that individual opinions should not impede a unified stance on Albanian interests, particularly regarding Kosovo. He called for greater Albanian representation in administration and expressed concern over assimilation, advocating for a long-term strategy to preserve national identity.	
ITA	Piana degli Albanesi	18 October	President Begaj and President Mattarella convened to visit Piana degli Albanesi of Sicily to engage with the Arbëreshë communities. Both presidents were welcomed by local dignitaries and participated in various cultural activities, including a visit to the Nicola Barbato Museum of Culture. The visit culminated in a ceremony at the Portella della Ginestra memorial, honoring the victims of the 1947 massacre, alongside local officials and representatives of victims' families.	
BIH	Sarajevo	22-23 October	During his two-day visit, President Begaj met with the Chairman of the Presidency Denis Bećirović and members Željka Cvijanović and Željko Komšić. They discussed strengthening bilateral relations, regional and European integration, and security issues. Begaj emphasised Albania's support for the sovereignty and territorial integrity of Bosnia and Herzegovina, while urging them to reconsider their stance on Kosovo. They also focused on economic cooperation and infrastructure projects, including the Blue Corridor and the Ionian Adriatic Pipeline.	
ITA	Bologna	3 December	President Begaj visited Bologna, where he was received by children from the local Albanian school, an initiative of the Korabi Association dedicated to the preservation of the Albanian language. He conveyed his gratitude for the community's hospitality and commended the Albanian diaspora, including the Arbëresh, for their entrepreneurial drive, collaboration with Italians, and commitment to safeguarding cultural heritage. During his visit, Begaj engaged with distinguished local leaders, including Mayor Matteo Lepore, the incumbent President of Emilia-Romagna Irene Priolo and President-elect Michele De Pascale.	

== 2025 ==
Country	Areas visited	Dates	Details	Ref.
POL	Warsaw	28–29 April	participated in the tenth Three Seas Initiative leaders' meeting.	

== 2026 ==
Country	Areas visited	Dates	Details	Ref.
ITA	Milan	6 February	Attended the 2026 Winter Olympics.	
CRO	Dubrovnik	28–29 April	Attended the 11th Three Seas Initiative summit.	
UKR	Kyiv	15 July	Attended the 5th Ukraine-Southeast Europe Summit.	
NOR	Oslo	9 September	Begaj travelled to Oslo at the invitation of King Haakon VIII of Norway to attend the funeral of King Harald V of Norway.	

== Gallery ==
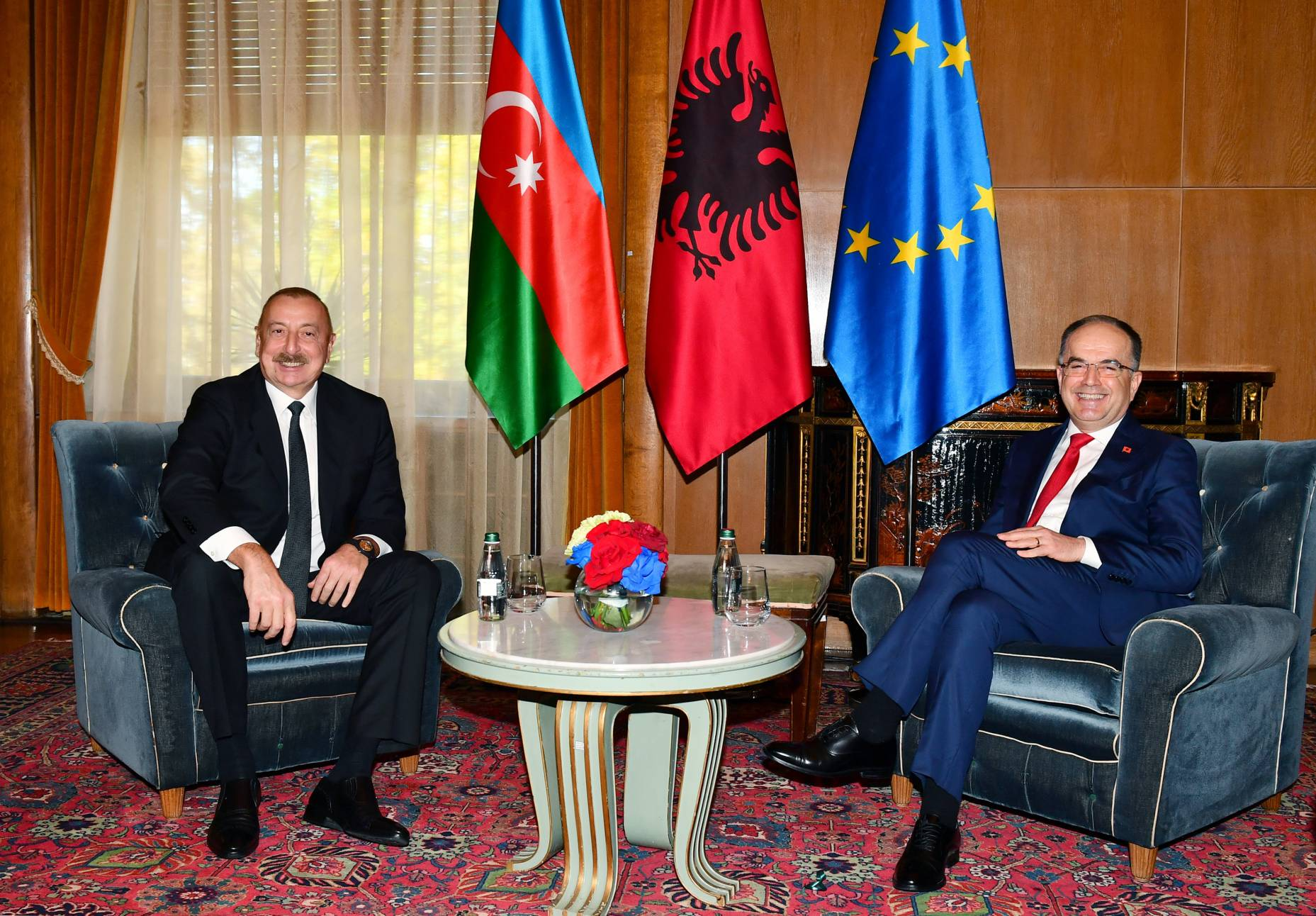
President Begaj with Ilham Aliyev in November 2022

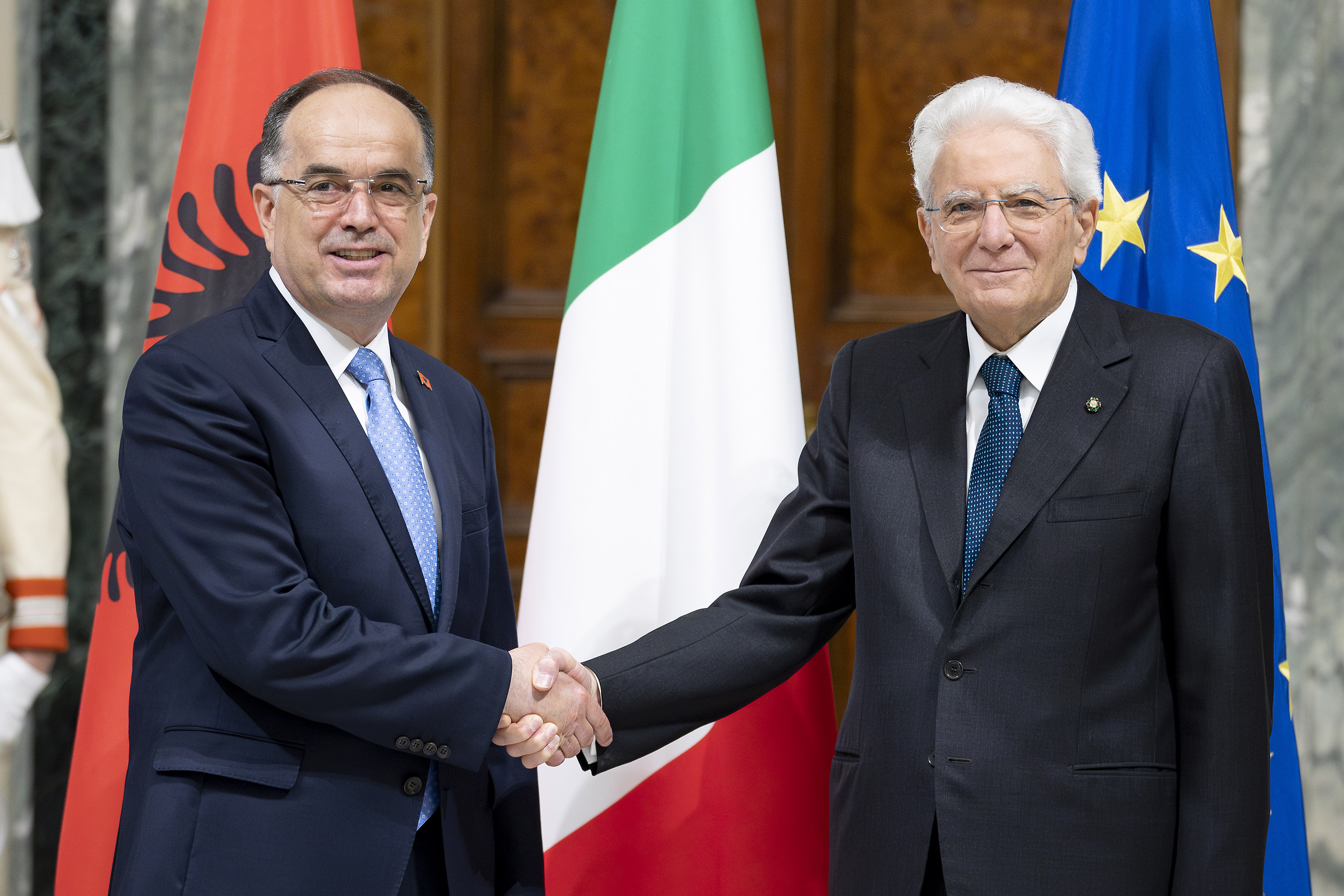
President Begaj with Sergio Mattarella in May 2023

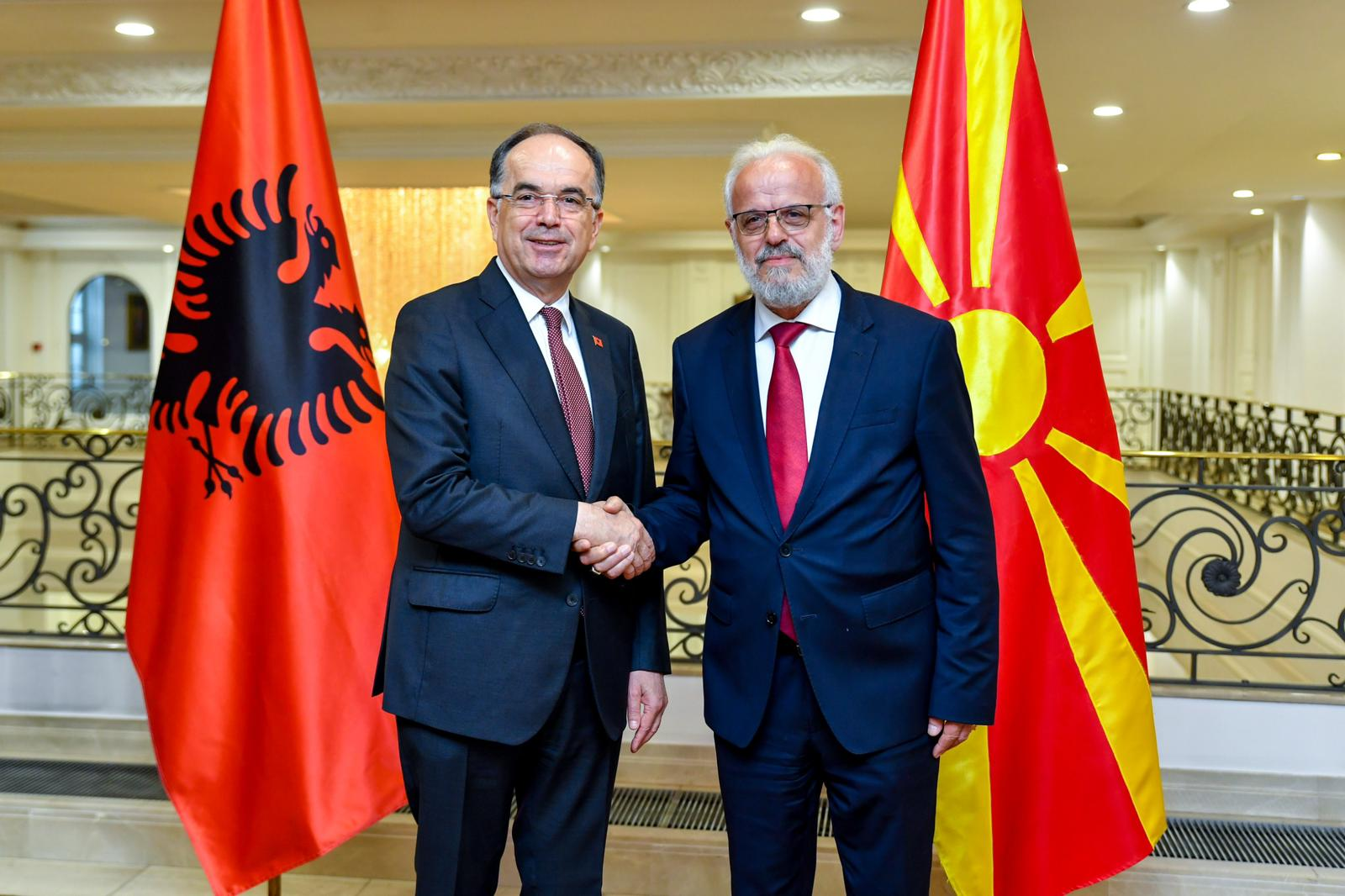
President Begaj with Talat Xhaferi in June 2024

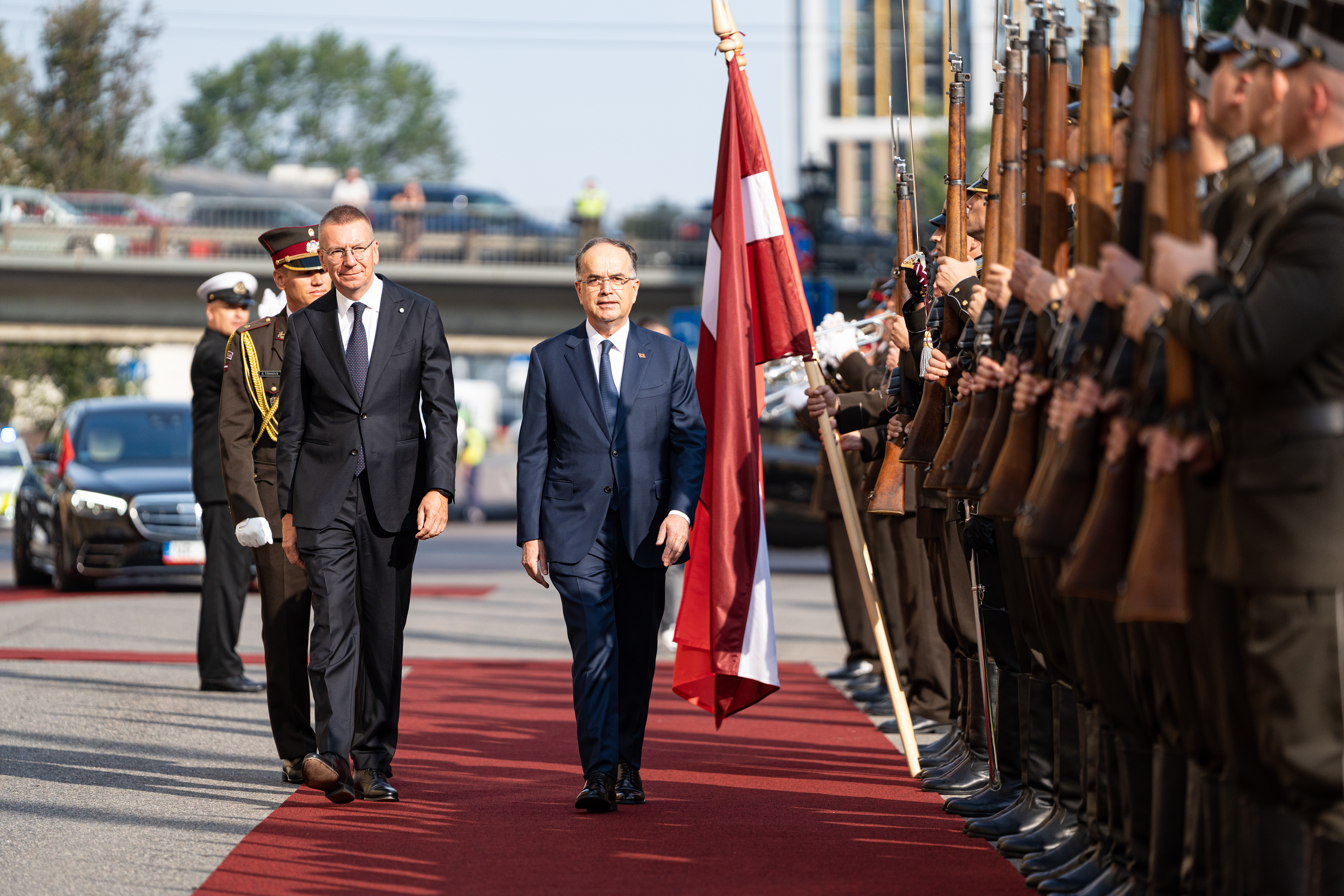
President Begaj with Edgars Rinkēvičs in September 2024

== Multilateral meetings ==
Multilateral meetings of the following intergovernmental organizations took place during Bajram Begaj's presidency (2022–Present).

Group	Year				
Group	2022	2023	2024	2025	2026
BBP	12–13 September, (Slovenia) Brdo pri Kranju	11 September, (North Macedonia) Skopje	8 October (Montenegro) Tivat	6 October (Albania) Durrës	

== See also ==
- Politics of Albania
- Foreign relations of Albania
- International recognition of Kosovo
