= Prefect (Albania) =

A prefect (Albanian: Prefekt, [pɾɛˈfɛkt]) in Albania is the representative of the central government in each of the country's 12 counties. Their primary mission is to guarantee the implementation of the government's political program at the regional level. Prefects are appointed and dismissed by the Council of Ministers.

== History ==
After the Albanian declaration of independence, the government led by Ismail Qemali split Albania into prefectures, each of which would be headed by a prefect, who would represent the state. Below the prefectures were the sub-prefectures and communes. Prefects at the time had a much greater role in local government, being not only representatives of the central government but also the appointed leaders of their respective prefectures, which functioned as the first-level administrative divisions of the state.

Prefects would be nominated by the interior minister and appointed by the prime minister, and later the king.

The system of prefectures and sub-prefectures remained in place under the People's Socialist Republic of Albania, until they were abolished in place of counties (qarqe) in 1953.

Prefectures were re-instituted in 1992 after the fall of communism in Albania under law no. 7608 of 1992, "On prefectures". They no longer served as administrative divisions and simply referred to the jurisdiction of the prefect. Each prefecture contained within its borders several first-level administrative divisions. The role of the prefect under the 1992 law is largely similar to that defined in current legislation.

The 1992 law was repealed and replaced in 2002, where the notion of prefectures was removed and the jurisdiction of the prefect was tied to the counties of Albania. The 2002 law was itself replaced in 2016 by an updated version.

== Eligibility ==
Prefects must be Albanian citizens with a Master of Science or an equivalent diploma and have at least 5 years of experience in the civil service. They must also not be disqualified from serving in a public function according to the law.

A prefect additionally cannot be a member of the Council of Ministers, an elected official, or a director, lawyer, notary, consultant, or representative of a for-profit or not-for-profit organization, insofar as the work of these organizations intersects with the prefect's "administrative jurisdiction."

== Responsibilities ==
Among the primary responsibilities of a prefect are:

- verifying the legality of decisions, orders, and directives issued by local government
- reporting periodically to the Council of Ministers on the actions taken by local government
- reporting on the actions taken by dependent institutions of the central government at the regional level
- directing the prevention and management of the effects of a civil emergency
- taking part in and directing official state ceremonies at the regional level, as required by law
- helping local government bodies follow implement the state budget
- controls and oversees the implementation of the sectorial policies of the central government in farming, healthcare, education, the environment, public order, fire services, welfare, tourism, and culture
- cooperating with agencies and inspectorates operating at the regional level, and reporting inconsistencies to the relevant minister
- cooperating with the Central Election Commission (KQZ) and other local election bodies, in accordance with the electoral code.

== Verification ==
All normative acts (acts with legal force) must be reported to the county prefect by the relevant local government body within 10 days of their decree.

Within 10 days of their deposit, the prefect must issue a decision on the legality of the acts presented. If the prefect determines the acts are incompatible with the relevant law, they may be returned to the issuing authority in what amounts to a weak veto—no additional restrictions are placed on the issuing authority simply reconfirming the act without any changes.

If, after an act has already been returned once, the prefect still finds it to be incompatible with the relevant law, the case may be referred to the administrative court with jurisdiction in the region. The court then decides whether the act is null and void or will remain in force.

== Officeholders ==
County	Prefect	Took office	Refs
Berat	Valbona Zylyftari	22 May 2019	
Dibër	Nexhbedin Shehu	1 November 2017	
Durrës	Emiljan Jani	6 April 2022	
Elbasan	Ilir Bejtja	19 February 2025	
Fier	Arben Çuko	7 November 2024	
Gjirokastër	Odise Kote	21 October 2020	
Korçë	Nertil Jole	13 April 2022	
Kukës	Dritan Baji	5 February 2025	
Lezhë	Taulant Malshi	22 January 2025	
Shkodër	Majlinda Angoni	9 September 2020	
Tiranë	Afrim Qëndro	18 November 2021	
Vlorë	Plator Nesturi	9 January 2025	

== See also ==
- Prefect
- Prefect (France)
