= Bajram Begaj =

President of Albania since 2022

His Excellency Major General Bajram Begaj
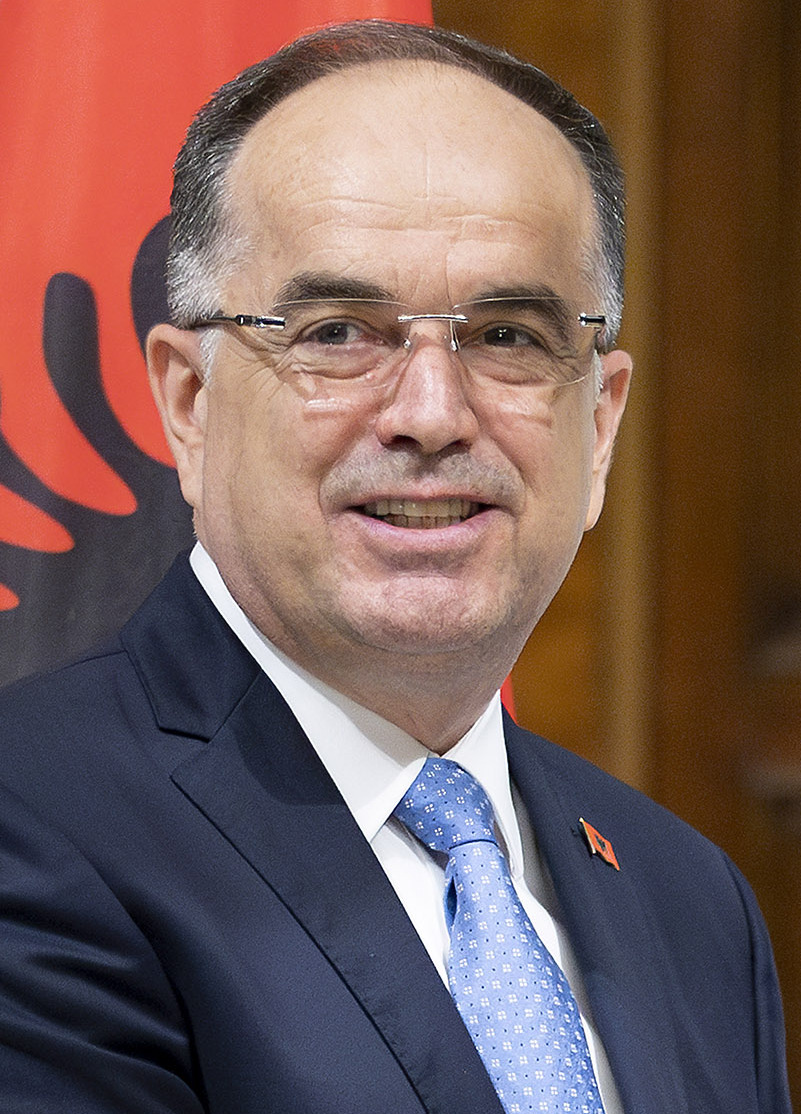
- Begaj in 2023

8th President of Albania
- Incumbent
- Assumed office 24 July 2022
- Prime Minister: Edi Rama
- Preceded by: Ilir Meta

26th Chief of General Staff of Albanian Armed Forces
- In office 29 July 2020 – 4 June 2022
- President: Ilir Meta
- Minister: Olta Xhaçka; Niko Peleshi
- Preceded by: Bardhyl Kollçaku
- Succeeded by: Arben Kingji

Personal details
- Born: 20 March 1967 (age 59) Rrogozhinë, People's Socialist Republic of Albania
- Party: Independent
- Spouse: Armanda Begaj
- Children: 2
- Education: Faculty of Medicine
- Profession: Military officer

Military service
- Allegiance: Albania
- Branch/service: Albanian People's Army; Armed Forces
- Years of service: 1988 – 2022
- Rank: Major General

Bajram Begaj (born 20 March 1967) is an Albanian politician and military officer serving as president of Albania since 2022. Prior to his election as president, he served as the 26th Chief of General Staff of the Albanian Armed Forces from July 2020 to June 2022. On 3 June 2022, Begaj was officially nominated by the governing Socialist Party as the candidate for the fourth round of the 2022 presidential election. He is the second president in post-communist Albania to come from a predominantly military background.

== Life and career ==
=== 1967–2021: Early life and military ===
Begaj was born on 20 March 1967, in Rrogozhinë. He graduated from Tirana's Faculty of Medicine in 1989 and became an active medical officer in 1998. Having completed his professional doctorate degree, he holds the title "associate professor" in medicine.

During his 31-year military career, Begaj has taken part in numerous training seminars and completed courses in Security and Defense, the Advanced Postgraduate School of Medicine, a Postgraduate Specialization in Gastrohepatology, a Hospital Management Course and Strategic Medical Leadership Course in the United States, a Specialization Course in Medicine and a Health Course in Greece.

Begaj previously served as the Commander of the Doctrine and Training Command in the Albanian Armed Forces. He held various other posts, including: Chief of the Military Medical Unit and Deputy Military Director of SUT, Director of the Military Hospital, Director of the Health Inspectorate, etc. He was appointed Chief of the General Staff of the Albanian Armed Forces in July 2020 and assumed office later that month.

=== 2022–present: Presidency ===
On 24 July 2022, Begaj was inaugurated as the incumbent president of Albania for a five-year term. His election followed a series of parliamentary proceedings that commenced on 10 May, when the parliament of Albania initiated the process for presidential selection. Despite challenges in achieving consensus on a suitable candidate, the governing Socialist Party (PS) nominated Begaj on 3 June for the fourth round of voting, after he resigned from his position as Chief of the General Staff of the Albanian Armed Forces. He was subsequently elected with 78 votes in favor, exceeding the required majority, while the opposition led by the Democratic Party (PD) abstained from participation in the voting process. The tenure of Begaj has been marked by a commitment to enhancing Albania's international relations and advancing Euro-Atlantic integration. Since assuming office, he has actively engaged in diplomatic efforts, undertaking numerous international diplomatic visits to foster partnerships and elevate Albania's global standing.

In 2026, Begaj issued a decree granting Albanian citizenship to former New York City mayor Eric Adams.

== Personal life ==
Begaj is married to Armanda Begaj, with whom he has two sons, Dorian and Klajdi.

== Honours and accolades ==
- Italy – Honorary Citizen of Pallagorio
- Italy – Honorary Citizen of Rossano
- Kosovo – Honorary Citizen of Deçan
- Kosovo – Honorary Citizen of Drenas

Military offices
Preceded by Bardhyl Kollçaku	Chief of General Staff of Albanian Armed Forces; 2020–2022	Succeeded by Arben Kingji
Political offices
Preceded by Ilir Meta	President of Albania; 2022–present	Incumbent
Order of precedence
First	Order of precedence of Albania as President	Succeeded by Edi Rama as Prime Minister
