= Adriatik Llalla =

Albanian lawyer

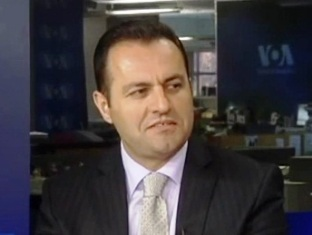

General Prosecutor of the Republic of Albania
- In office December 2012 – December 2017
- President: Bujar Nishani
- Preceded by: Ina Rama
- Succeeded by: Arta Marku

Inspector General of the High Inspectorate of Declaration and Audit of Assets HIDAA
- In office October 2008 – December 2012
- President: Bamir Topi
- Preceded by: Fatmira Laska
- Succeeded by: Shkëlqim Ganaj

Personal details
- Born: 09.10.1969 Gramsh, Albania
- Education: University of Tirana
- Occupation: Attorney

Adriatik Llalla is an Albanian lawyer. He served as the prosecutor general of the Republic of Albania from 2012 to 2017. During the years 2008 to 2012 he was inspector general of the High Inspectorate of Declaration and Audit of Assets and Conflict of Interest (HIDAACI).

He was the first official worldwide to be banned by the U.S. secretary of state from entering the US due to allegations of corruption.

In March 2018, he was at the center of investigations for suspicions of corruption. In September 2021, he was sentenced to two years in prison and confiscation of assets, for failing to declare them in full. In the same period, he fled to Italy, being arrested following an international arrest warrant issued by Tirana's Interpol in Rome in December of the same year. He was officially granted asylum in Italy in March 2023.

== Biography ==
=== Background and personal life ===
Adriatik Llalla was born on October 9, 1969, at the village of Llalla to Sulova province, Gramsh, Albania, where he was raised in a middle-class family. He is the youngest of five children of Xhemal and Sanije Llalla. He has said that he grew up in a family persecuted by the communist regime. His father, Xhemal Llalla, was sentenced in 1947 to life in prison, as he was suspected as a CIA agent seeking to overthrow the communist regime. Other family members were imprisoned and interned.

The Llalla family in 1994 settled in the capital of Albania, Tirana.

Llalla since 1999 is married to Ardjana Llalla, and together they have three children.

=== Education ===
Llalla studied at the Faculty of Law, University of Tirana, and in 1997 graduated in law. From 2009 to 2011, he completed the studies "Second level Master" for crime sciences, at the Department of Criminal Law Faculty, University of Tirana. In 2012 he received the title "Advocate" at the National Chamber of Advocacy Tirana. From 2014 to 2017, he completed his doctoral studies PhD "Doctorate in Criminal Sciences", at the Department of Criminal Law, Faculty of Law, University of Tirana. He has participated in many trainings of the School of Magistrates and various conferences inside and outside the country.

He is the author of several articles in various media on topics such as declaration and audit of assets, conflict of interest and the criminal field.

== Professional career ==
Llalla started his career as a judicial police officer in Lushnjë District Prosecutor's Office, where he worked as a prosecutor for three years. He was prosecutor of Kavajë and head prosecutor of Fier until 2005. He was deputy head prosecutor in Tirana from 2005 to 2008. He joined the Prosecutorial Council in 2006 and was its chairman from 2007 to 2008. In 2008, he was elected head of the High Inspectorate of the Declaration and Audit of Assets. In 2010, he was elected head of the Integrity Experts' Network. On 3 December 2012, he was appointed general prosecutor of Albania under the right-wing government of Sali Berisha and with the consent of the majority of the Albanian Parliament.

On 12 December 2017, Lalla's five-year term expired. On 13 February 2018, he announced his resignation from the judiciary, not wishing to continue his career as a simple prosecutor, a move that was interpreted as an attempt to avoid the vetting process from the Independent Qualifications Commission.

In the summer of 2016, Llalla received messages containing threats against his life and his family. The messages (written and telephone), which came from organized crime gangs that the Prosecutor General's Office was investigating at the time, were considered serious, and the Lalla family was initially placed under heavy guard. Several EU countries were willing to offer hospitality to the family, and Germany (the name of the country was kept secret for several years) was finally chosen, where his wife, in advanced pregnancy, and his two children moved permanently that autumn.

On 3 December 2012, the president of Albania announced that he had selected Lalla for the post of prosecutor general. The selection was ratified by the Parliament of the country, with 75 votes in favor (PD), while 54 MPs of the Socialist Party abstained. As soon as he took office, Llalla immediately rehired six prosecutors previously dismissed by his PS-appointed predecessor, Ina Rama.

=== Seizure of ILDKPKI's documents and server ===
On 7 November 2016, the Tirana Prosecutor's Office, following an order of the prosecutor general, proceeded to seize dossiers and the central server of High Inspectorate of the Declaration and Audit of Assets and Conflict of Interest (ILDKPKI). The Prosecutor's Office announced the opening of an investigation into the files of ILDKPKI containing the wealth declarations of high officials accused of conflict of interest. The investigation limited during the Chief Inspector, Shkëlqim Ganaj's presidency after it was found that during that period and despite ample allegations the Authority did not indict any high-ranking officials. The judiciary in all three instances vindicated Ganaj, considering the seizure and even the examination of the files illegal and abusive. The inspector general of ILDKPKI resorted to the judiciary in order to delegitimize the action of the prosecutor general. The Albanian courts in all three levels declared the action of the prosecutor illegal and abusive.

Socialist Party MP Erion Braçe had stated in an interview that the attorney general's aim was to block judicial reform. The same was noted by several media outlets, pointing out that the seizure occurred at a time when ILDKPKI was examining the asset declarations of judges and prosecutors who were expected to follow the adoption of the law "On the transitional re-evaluation of judges and prosecutors in the Republic of Albania." (Note: The vetting prοcess focuses on the re-evaluation of the country's judiciary in order to prove both their competence and their honesty. It is based on three criteria: assets, background and proficiency assessment.) (Note: At that time the law was suspended by the Constitutional Court following an appeal by the Democratic Party and the Judges' Union. There were reports that even within the ranks of prosecutors, the collection of signatures to oppose the law had begun.) Some argued that Llalla was trying to avoid checking his own assets.

However, the most vocal opponent of Llalla and his intentions was the American ambassador in Tirana, Donald Lu.

=== Clash with the US ambassador in Tirana ===
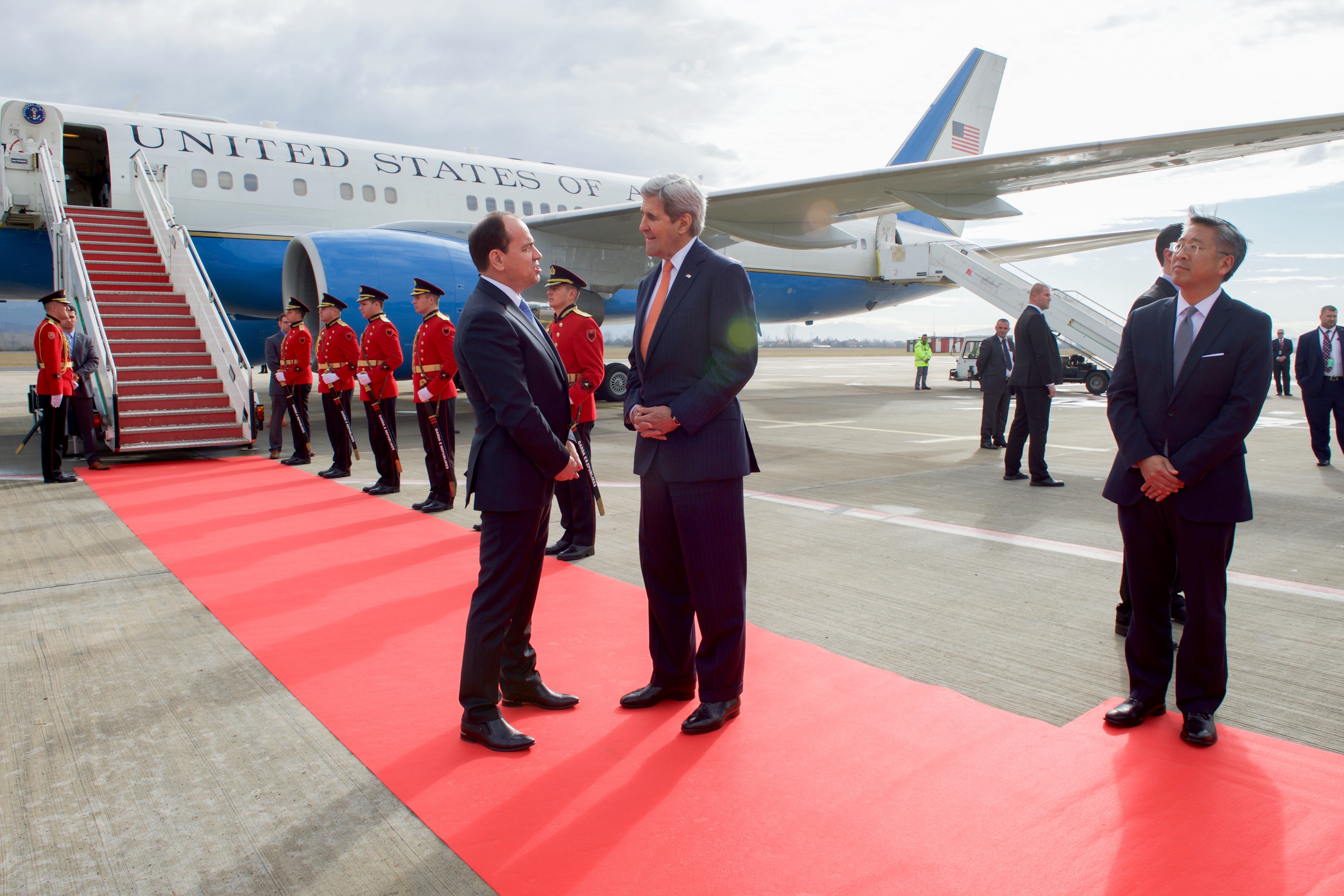
U.S. Secretary of State John Kerry, flanked by U.S. Ambassador to Albania Donald Lu, chats with Albanian President Bujar Nishani after arriving in Tirana, on February 14, 2016.

The conflict between the general prosecutor and the US ambassador to Albania began almost immediately after Lu's transfer to the embassy. According to Llalla's written reports to both the president of the country and the speaker of the Albanian parliament, as well as to the US Congress itself, Lu quickly went beyond the limits of his diplomatic duties and became a political actor in the country. Lu, in collaboration with organizations funded by the George Soros Foundation, tried to manipulate public opinion and officials to pressure the government and opposition to implement the reform. According to Lalla, he tried on several occasions to pressure the prosecutor to speak out publicly in favor of the reform and to encourage his subordinates to do the same. He even claimed that Lu had suggested to him that, if necessary, he should even arrest Ilir Meta, whom Lu considered to be a corrupt politician, for obstructing judicial reform.

The confrontation began to take public form in early February 2017, when Lu accused Llalla by name that his actions undermining efforts to clean up the judicial system. "...We are already seeing powerful people try to maintain their control over the Courts and over the Prosecutors.... The most recent example of this is the action of Albania's Prosecutor General. For more than 18 months he has consistently and loudly spoken out against the Judicial Reform. In November and December, Prosecutors tried and failed to seize the HIDAACI computer servers that are vital for the vetting", said Lu.

Llalla, who, a few days before Lu's statement, had been denied a visa by the US Embassy in Tirana, argued that the real reason for Lu's specific attack was the decision of the prosecution to open an investigation of environmental damages caused by Bankers Petroleum, one of the largest foreign companies operating in Albania.

At the end of Llalla's term, there was a heated debate between the government and the opposition on whether the prosecutor general's term should be extended because the body responsible (High Council of Prosecution) for electing a new prosecutor general had not yet been established, or whether an interim prosecutor general should be appointed by the government.

Ambassador Lu took up the cause of the interim prosecutor and again publicly attacked Llalla, saying: "...The old justice system protected wealthy politicians through corruption and political influence. The new system cannot have an attorney general who does not prosecute." Although the opposition considered the solution of the interim prosecutor general unconstitutional and a de facto regression of judicial reform, on 18 December 2018, amid riots both inside and outside Parliament, Arta Markou was appointed provisional prosecutor general with the 69 votes of the Socialist Party.

One year after of the start of this public debate, on February 14, 2018, the US State Department banned Llalla and his family from entering the US, on grounds that he was suspected of being involved in significant corruption.

=== Resignation from the judiciary, prosecution ===
On 10 February 2018, in a letter to the president of the Republic, Llalla announced his decision to leave the judiciary permanently. As a result, the Independent Qualification Commission (KPK) decided to discontinue its re-evaluation process, as stipulated both in the Constitution and in the relevant law no. 84/2016, On the Transitional Re-Evaluation of Judges and Prosecutors. 39 days after the KPK's decision was announced, the Public Commissioner appealed the decision. The Special Appellate College dismissed the request of the public commissioner on 18 June 2018.

Four days after his resignation from the judiciary, the State Department announced its decision to ban him and his family from entering the US due to his involvement in significant corruption. The Albanian authorities responded to the State Department's complaints by opening criminal proceedings against him.

On 15 March 2018, the prosecution at the Court of First Instance Durres registered criminal proceeding no. 447 registered the charging of Llalla with criminal offenses of "concealment of assets", "abuse of duty" and "money laundering" and "failure to declare money at the borders". Two months later, however, the Durres Prosecutor's Office was finally unable to substantiate the above charges, declared itself incompetent, and referred the case to the Special Anti-Corruption Structure (SPAK), with the indictment amended as follows: "Refusal to declare, deny, conceal or false declaration of wealth, elected private interests and public servants or any other person who has the legal obligation to declare", "Non-declaration of cash amounts at the border", "Cleaning of the products of criminal offense" and "Abuse of office".

The Serious Crimes Prosecutor's Office also contacted the US asking for assistance regarding the financial expenses that Llalla's wife, Ardiana, had during the period she stayed there, when she gave birth to the second son of the Llalla family. The American judiciary responded by providing information which, in the opinion of the prosecution, was of little relevance to the substantiation of the charges in respect of which criminal proceedings had begun.

Finally, and after the investigation period was extended as far as legally possible, on March 9, 2020, the former prosecutor general was officially taken as a defendant on charges of false declaration and concealment of property. This was regarding not declaring an amount which was spent in Germany,

On September 22, 2021, the anti-corruption Court of Appeals sentenced Llalla for "false declaration of assets" with two years in prison, seizure of 2.2 hectares of agricultural land and an apartment in the city of Durrës, as well as an exemption for five years in the exercise of public functions. Llalla was also found guilty of unreasonable expenses of $7,000 incurred for the birth of his son in the United States.

"I want to salute the Italian authorities, who granted political asylum to the Adriatic Llala, the Prosecutor General. I don't say that Llalla was a strong or flawless prosecutor, but Albanians should know that Adriatik Llalla was sanctioned for daring to denounce the companies of Soros and Rex Tillerson. That's the truth. This is with documents. Companies that do not respect the laws of the country. And as soon as he notified the US Congress of these actions, he was retaliatorily declared non grata. That's the truth."

— Sali Berisha

Llalla had never admitted to the charges against him, stating that every action he took was legal and that the decision on his sentence had been made before the investigation and trial began.

Following the appeal decision which confirmed the first instance decision, Lalla disappeared from Albania. SPAK issued an international arrest warrant for him on 8 October 2021. He was arrested by Interpol two months later in Rome, Italy, where he had taken refuge. According to his lawyer, in February 2023, the Italian authorities granted him political asylum.

== Notes ==
Preceded by Ina Rama	Albanian Prosecutor General; 2012–2017	Succeeded by Arta Marku
