= Xhezair Zaganjori =

Albanian lawyer and judge (born 1957)

Chief Justice of the Supreme Court of Albania
- In office 24 April 2013 – 26 July 2019
- Nominated by: Bujar Nishani
- Preceded by: Shpresa Beçaj

Member of the Constitutional Court of Albania
- In office 6 January 2003 – 21 March 2013
- Nominated by: Alfred Moisiu
- Preceded by: Tefta Zaka
- Succeeded by: Fatos Lulo

Personal details
- Born: 9 March 1957 (age 69) Shkodër, Albania
- Spouse: Neriman Marika
- Children: 2
- Education: Faculty of Law, University of Tirana

Xhezair Zaganjori (born March 9, 1957, in Shkodër) is an Albanian lawyer and judge. He has served as the President of the Supreme Court of Albania since April 2013, after the termination of his term as a member of the Constitutional Court of Albania.

== Biography ==
Xhezair Zaganjori was born on March 9, 1957, in the northerly city of Shkodër. He graduated from the Faculty of Law at the University of Tirana in 1981. Since graduating, Zaganjori has been working as a lecturer in Public International Law, European Law and Human Rights Law at the Faculty of Law of the University of Tirana, the Albanian School of Magistrates as well as the Institute for European Studies in Tirana.

During the period from 1992 to 1997, Zaganjori served as the Ambassador of the Republic of Albania to the Federal Republic of Germany. In 1998, he obtained a PhD in Legal studies and worked for a year as a scientific collaborator at the Max Planck Institute in Heidelberg, researching on issues of International Law and European Union Law.

In 2009, Zaganjori was awarded the academic title of "Professor" in view of his academic and lecturing positions. He is the author of several scientific articles and books both in Albania and abroad, and he is also an active participant in various International Congresses and Conferences.

Since 2001, Prof. Zaganjori has been a member of the Court of Conciliation and Arbitration of the Organization for Security and Cooperation in Europe (OSCE), in Vienna.

Zaganjori was appointed as a Member of the Supreme Court of Albania on 22 March 2013, by decree no.8065, after serving a ten-year (2003–13) term as a Member of the Constitutional Court. He was appointed as President of the Supreme Court on 24 April 2013, by decree no. 8120 of the President of Albania.
