= Administrative courts in Albania =

The Administrative Courts are an integral part of the Judicial system of Albania, in that they deal with administrative law disputes, particularly disputes concerning the exercise of public power. Their role is to ascertain that official acts are consistent with the law and they are separate from Courts of General Jurisdiction, such as the District Courts. The Administrative Court System is a relatively new addition to the Court System of Albania, having been established in 2012, by virtue of Law no. 49/2012 "On the organization and functioning of administrative courts and administrative disputes".

Initial jurisdiction for these cases belongs to the Administrative Courts of First Instance, while the Administrative Court of Appeals is the competent court for the review of the lower court decisions. After the Court of Appeals has rendered its decision, the aggrieved parties can seek redress to the Administrative Chamber of the Supreme Court of Albania.

== Courts ==
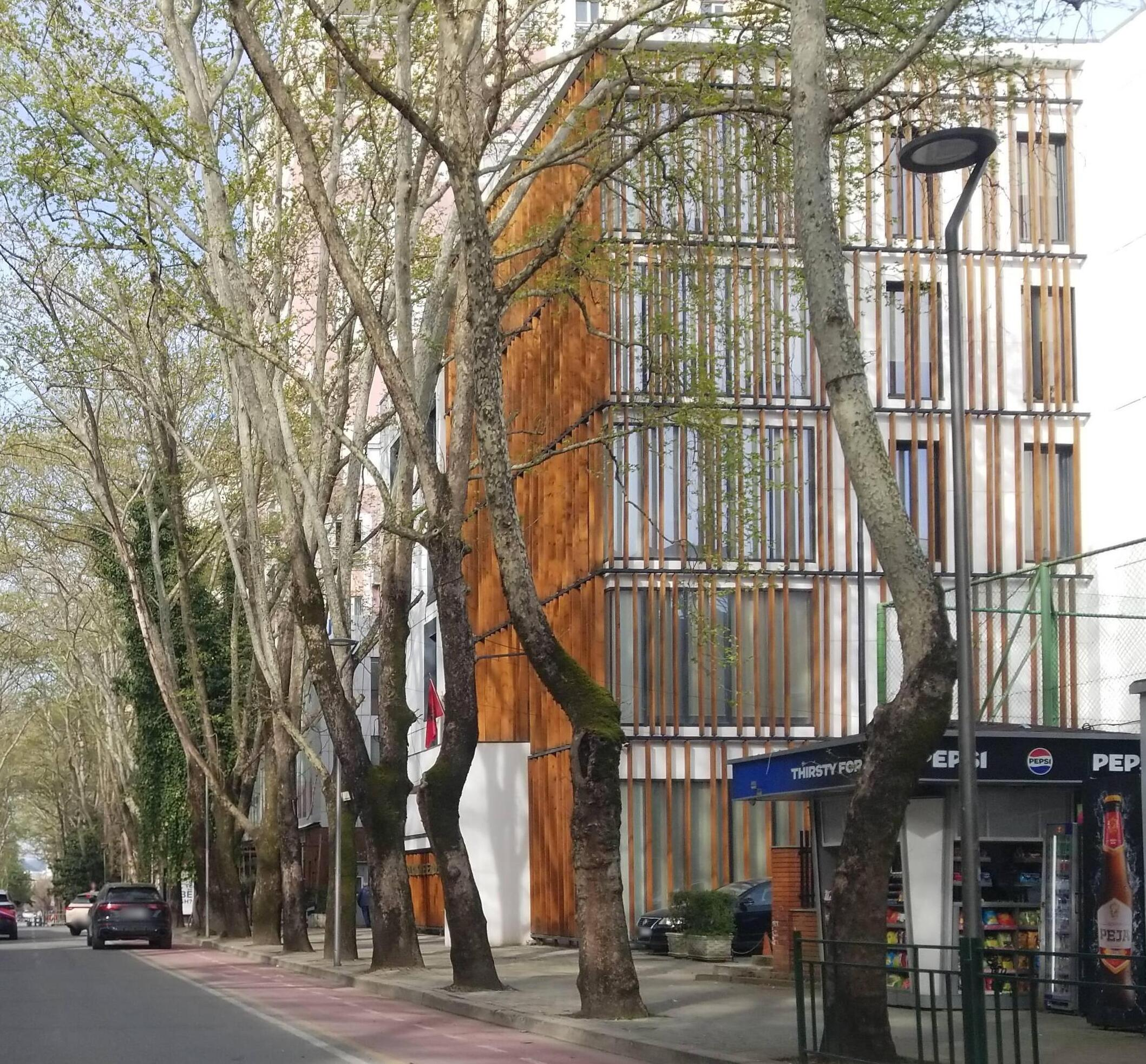
Administrative Court of Appeal in TIrana

At present, there are six Administrative Courts of First Instance, comprising 36 judges, while there is one Administrative Court of Appeal, made up of 7 judges. The respective courts are as follows:

- Administrative Court of First Instance of Durrës
- Administrative Court of First Instance of Gjirokastra
- Administrative Court of First Instance of Korce
- Administrative Court of First Instance of Shkodër
- Administrative Court of First Instance of Tirana
- Administrative Court of First Instance of Vlora
- Administrative Court of Appeal

== See also ==
- Politics of Albania
- Judiciary of Albania
