= Law of Albania =

Albania has a civil law system with influences from both the Napoleonic Code and the German Civil Code, by way of the Swiss Civil Code. The national Constitution, adopted by referendum in 1998, is the state's supreme law. Other laws are passed by the unicameral parliament, Kuvendi, and implemented by the Albanian government.

The judiciary of Albania is organized by the Constitution and the subsequent laws passed by the Parliament, composed of the district and appeals courts for each judicial district, as well as several courts with national jurisdiction, including the Supreme Court and Constitutional Court. Extraordinary courts are explicitly forbidden in the Constitution.

== History ==
From at least the Early Middle Ages until the early 20th century, Albania was governed by customary law, the Kanun, a set of moral codes passed down orally by tribal elders. This first began to change with the Albanian Declaration of Independence and later under the Albanian Republic and the Albanian Kingdom under King Zog I, who established the Albanian constitutions of the time and the first Albanian civil code, based largely on those of the major European powers.

During the Italian and later German occupations of Albania during World War II, Albania was governed under the fascist laws established by the occupiers. Upon Albania's liberation and the proclamation of the interim post-war government by the communists, all previous laws were made null and void, King Zog was barred from ever returning to the country and was dethroned, and elections were held that led to the establishment of the People's Republic of Albania.

Laws during the communist regime were nominally established by the People's Parliament (Kuvendi Popullor), and the Constitution guaranteed citizens some rights but made them subordinate to the greater goals of party unity and socialist revolution. Courts during this time were under the influence of the ruling Party of Labor and sham trials were often held that sentenced opposition figures and dissenters to forced labor, indefinite imprisonment, or death. Some would not even face a trial. The party's grip on power was enforced by the Sigurimi, Albania's notorious secret police of the time.

Student protests in 1990 and growing discontent eventually brought the first pluralist elections in Albania since the end of World War II, which also saw a provisional Constitution be established by the newly elected Parliament. The new Constitution, the law "On the major constitutional provisions," guaranteed private property rights, free elections, an accountable government, and freedom of expression.

This tumultuous period of Albanian history saw widespread civil unrest spurred on by the collapse of several pyramid schemes that had gripped the country, in large part due to the failures of government bodies to properly regulate them.

The current constitution was adopted by the Parliament in October of 1998 and approved via referendum. It was promulgated on 28 November 1998.

== See also ==
- Albanian nationality law
- Kanun of Lekë Dukagjini
