= Special Appellate College (Albania) =

Independent judicial panel in Albania

- Kolegji i Posaçëm i Apelimit
- Established: 25 July 2017
- Jurisdiction: Albania
- Location: Tirana
- Authorised by: Constitution of Albania
- Number of positions: 7 (2018)
- Website: Official Website

Chief Justice
- Currently: Natasha Mulaj

The Special Appellate College (KPA) (Albanian: Kolegji i Posaçëm i Apelimit) is an independent institution that is constitutionally tasked to oversee the transitional reassessment of judges and prosecutors in the Republic of Albania.

The reassessment process is carried out on the basis of three criteria: re-evaluation of wealth, personal character, professional skills.

A panel of 7 judges reviews the appeals made by the judges and prosecutors against the decisions of the Independent Qualification Commission.

The KPA has disciplinary jurisdiction over the members of the Constitutional Court, the High Judicial Council, the High Council of Prosecution, the Prosecutor General and the High Inspectorate of Justice.

== Judges ==
- Ardian Hajdari
- Natasha Mulaj
- Sokol Çomo
- Ina Rama
- Luan Daci
- Albana Shtylla
- Rezarta Schuetz
