= Appeals courts of Albania =

In Albania, the courts of appeal (Albanian: Gjykatat e Apelit) were the second instance courts that reviewied cases adjudicated by the lower district courts upon appeal from one of the parties.

The appeals courts were presided over by a panel of three judges. The decisions of these judges could be further appealed to the Supreme Court of Albania.

== Courts ==
The courts of appeal generally had territorial jurisdiction over a prescribed area. At the time of their replacement, there were 7 courts, composed of 89 judges:

- Court of Appeals of Durrës
- Court of Appeals of Gjirokastër
- Court of Appeals of Korçë
- Court of Appeals of Shkodër
- Court of Appeals of Tiranë
- Court of Appeals of Vlorë

In addition, a court of second instance with jurisdiction over the entire territory of the Republic of Albania existed with jurisdiction over serious crimes.

== Replacement ==
The several courts of appeal were replaced with a single national appeals court with jurisdiction over the entire country. These changes were introduced by the High Judicial Council as part of a redrawing of the judicial map of Albania.

== See also ==
- Politics of Albania
- Judiciary of Albania
- Law of Albania
