= Arben Kraja =

Albanian prosecutor

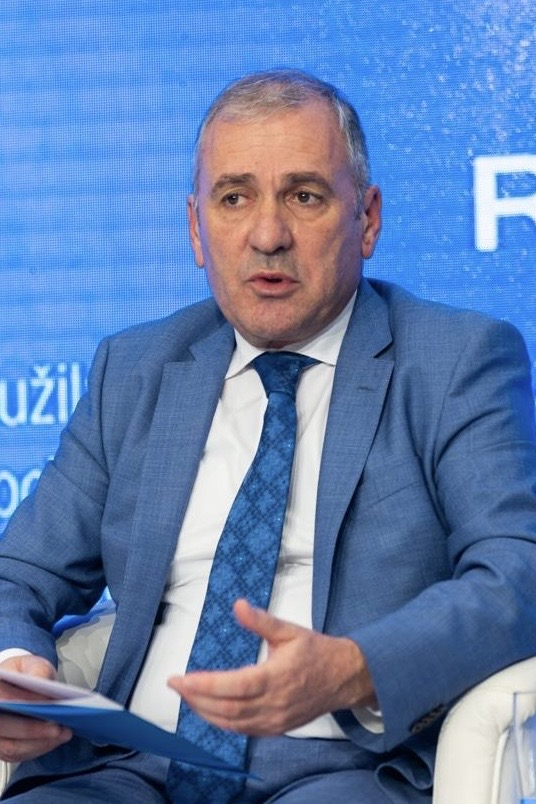
- Born: September 20, 1964 (age 61); Shkodër, PR Albania
- Citizenship: Albanian
- Education: Political Economy at the Faculty of Economics and Law at the Faculty of Law
- Occupation: Prosecutor
- Years active: 1987-present
- Known for: Head of Special Courts against Corruption in Albania

Arben Kraja (born September 20, 1964) is an Albanian prosecutor, known for serving as the first head of the Special Prosecution Office Against Corruption and Organized Crime (SPAK). Established in 2019 as part of Albania's justice reform, SPAK is responsible for combating corruption and organized crime. Arben Kraja has contributed to prosecuting high-profile cases and efforts to promote judicial accountability in Albania.

== Early life and education ==
Arben Kraja was born on September 20, 1964. He graduated from the University of Tirana in 1987 with a degree in political economy from the Faculty of Economics. In 1992, he studied for a law degree at the Faculty of Law in the same university.

== Career ==
Kraja began his career as an investigator at the Shkoder District Investigation Office in 1987, where he worked until 1992. He then joined the Investigation Directorate of the General Prosecutor’s Office, serving from 1993 to 1995. From 1997 to 2000, Kraja was the deputy chairman of the State Supreme Audit (KLSH), a role to which he was elected by the Parliament of Albania. He later worked as a prosecutor at the General Prosecutor’s Office from 2002 to 2007, becoming head of the Economic Crime and Corruption Department until 2013.

In 2019, Kraja was appointed the head of SPAK, where he led numerous high-profile investigations. His leadership in SPAK was supported by significant international partnerships, particularly with the United States Embassy and Italian authorities.

Kraja concluded his term as head of the Special Prosecution Office Against Corruption and Organized Crime (SPAK) in December 2023. His successor, Altin Dumani, took over the leadership of the institution. Dumani, the current head of SPAK, has been recognized by the U.S. Department of State for his contributions in advancing the rule of law and combating corruption in Albania. Dumani has been recognized by the U.S. government as a “Champion of the Anti-Corruption Fight.”

Currently, Kraja serves as a special prosecutor at SPAK and as the head of the Sector for International Cooperation and Joint Investigations.

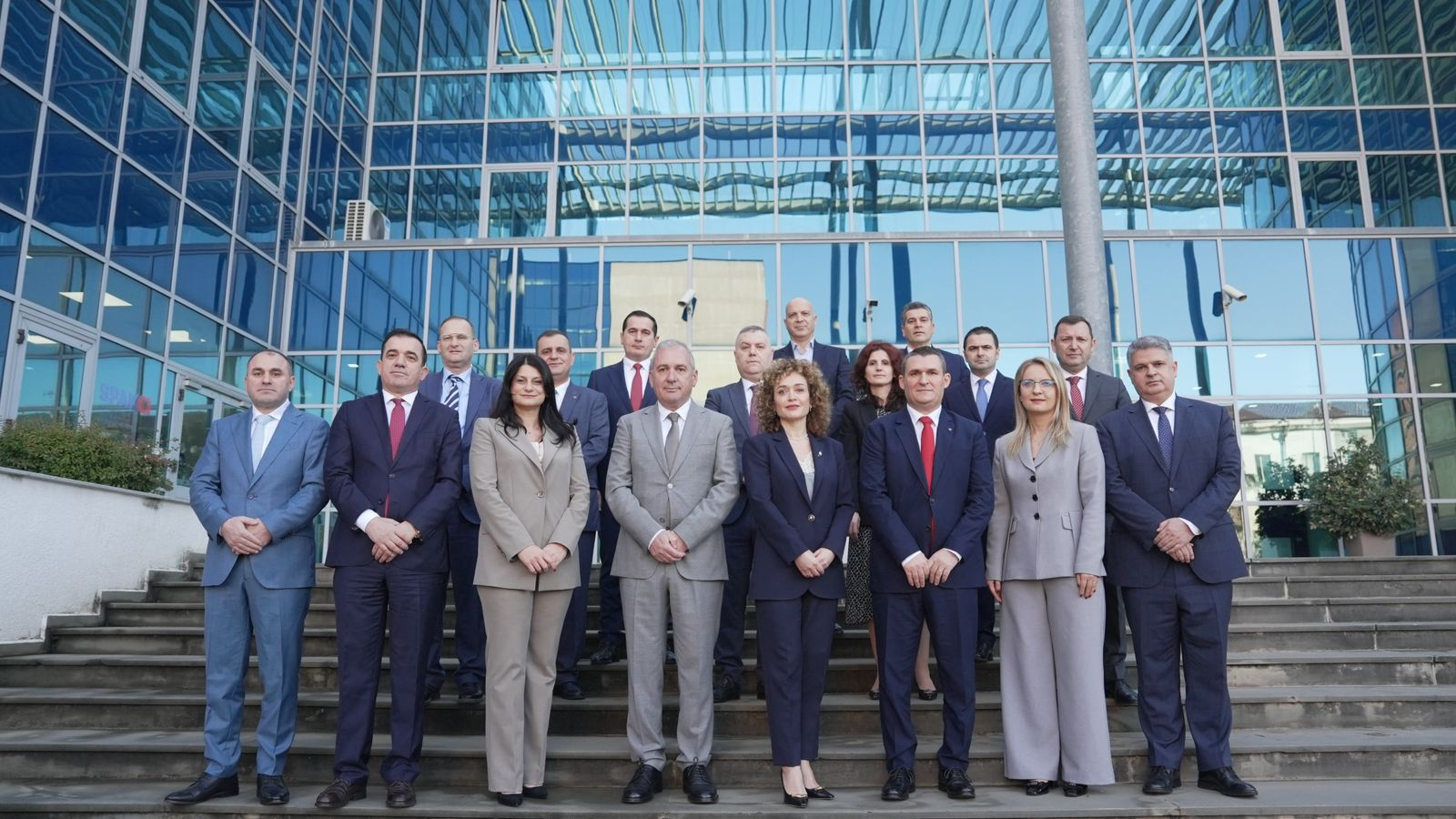
Arben Kraja and SPAK prosecutors

== High-profile investigations ==
One significant case during Kraja’s leadership at SPAK was the investigation into former prime minister Sali Berisha and his son-in-law, Jamarbër Malltezi, concerning corruption allegations related to the Partizani Sports Complex. The investigation was carried out by a team of SPAK special prosecutors. In October 2023, Malltezi was arrested, while Berisha, who had been declared persona non grata by the U.S. Department of State in 2021 for significant corruption, was placed under house arrest in December 2023.

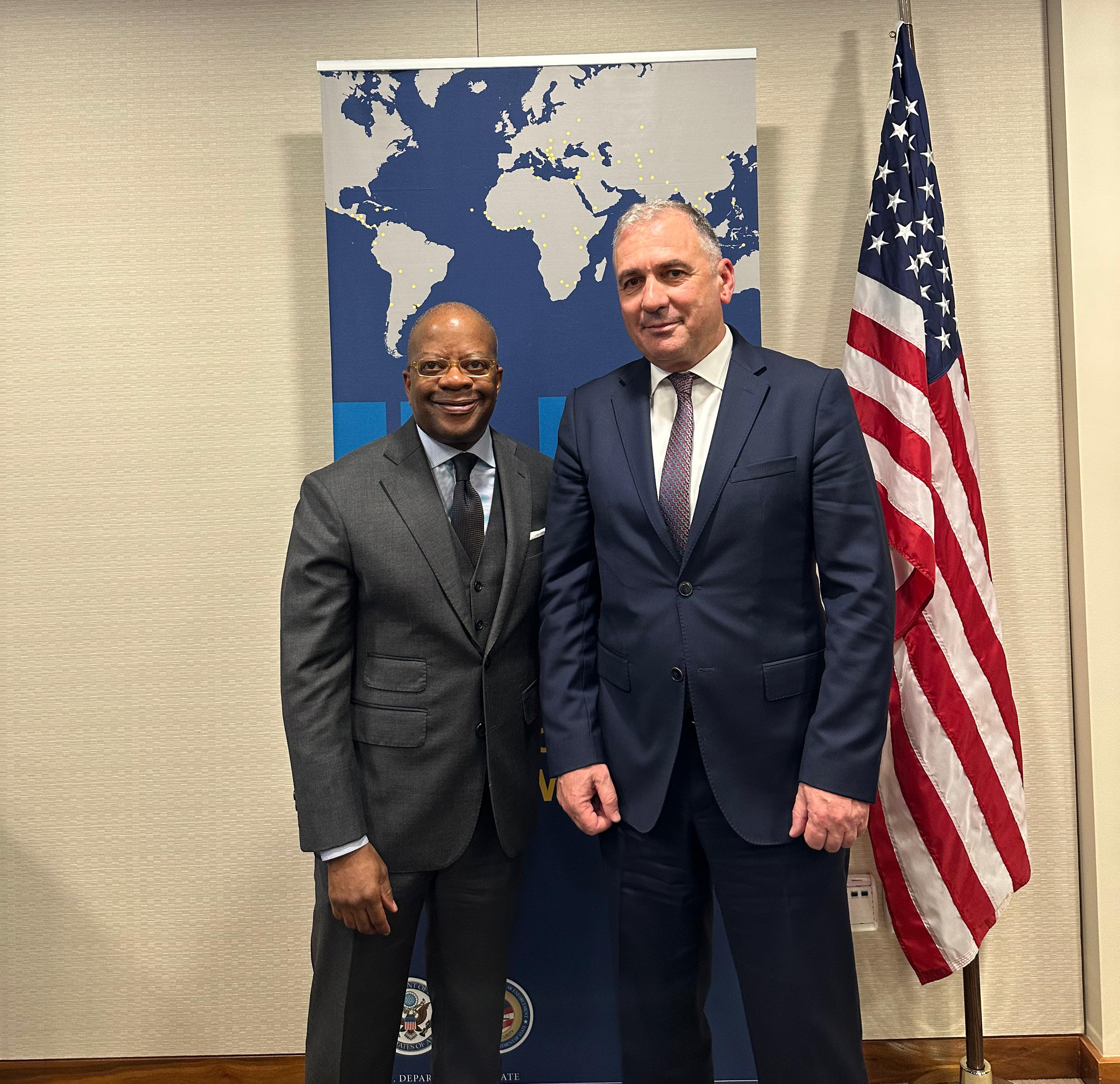
Arben Kraja met Mr. Todd D. Robinson in Washington DC, US, assistant secretary at the US Department of State

=== Ilir Meta investigation ===
Another significant case in which prosecutor Arben Kraja, in collaboration with other SPAK prosecutors, has been involved is the investigation into former president Ilir Meta, who faces accusations of money laundering, passive corruption, and asset concealment. On October 21, 2024, Meta was arrested following an order from The Special Court Against Corruption and Organized Crime. Ilir Meta is the second opposition political leader to be arrested after Sali Berisha.

== International and academic contributions ==
Arben Kraja has represented Albania in international judicial forums, including the Moneyval Committee of the Council of Europe. He has also participated in projects such as PACA, PROSECO, and MCC. As a trainer at the Albanian school of Magistrates for over a decade, Kraja has contributed to the continuing education of prosecutors and judges. Additionally, he has lectured at universities in Tirana.

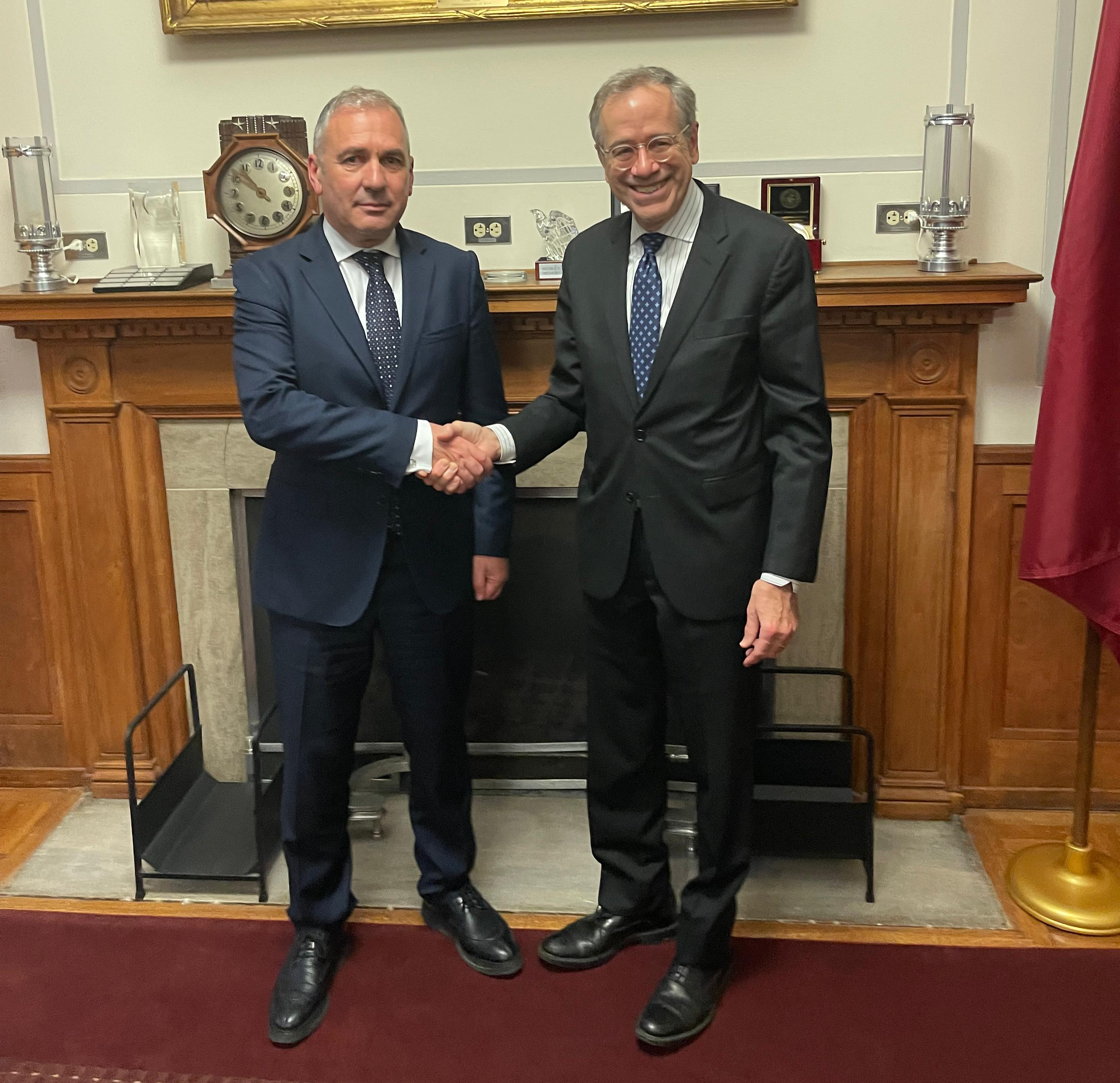
Arben Kraja and Bruce C. Swartz, deputy assistant attorney general and counselor for international affairs

== Vetting process ==
Prosecutor Arben Kraja successfully passed the vetting process under Albania’s justice reform. His assets, professional qualifications, and integrity were thoroughly evaluated, confirming his adherence to the standards required for judicial office. Both the United States and the European Union have consistently praised the vetting process as a crucial step in Albania’s efforts to restore trust in its judicial institutions.

== Awards and honors ==
On March 7, 2024, Arben Kraja was awarded the title "Cavaliere dell’Ordine al Merito della Repubblica Italiana" (Knight of the Order of Merit of the Italian Republic) by Italian President Sergio Mattarella. This recognition acknowledges his contributions to strengthening judicial cooperation between Italy and Albania and combating organized crime. The award was presented by the Italian Ambassador to Albania, Fabrizio Bucci.

== Interview for El País ==
In May 2022, Arben Kraja gave an interview to the Spanish newspaper El País, where he discussed the role of Albanian criminal groups in collaboration with the Italian mafia. As the head of SPAK, Kraja highlighted the international activities of Albanian criminal organizations and the challenges involved in combating them. He also emphasized efforts to strengthen Albania’s justice institutions and praised the importance of international cooperation in addressing organized crime and corruption in the region.
