= Marsida Xhaferllari =

Albanian judge (born 1975)

Justice of the Constitutional Court of Albania
- Incumbent
- Assumed office 14 November 2019
- Preceded by: Altina Xhoxha

Acting chairwoman of the Constitutional Court of Albania
- In office 10 March 2025 – 18 December 2025
- Preceded by: Holta Zaçaj
- Succeeded by: Fiona Papajorgji
- In office 25 January 2023 – 20 February 2023
- Preceded by: Vitore Tusha
- Succeeded by: Holta Zaçaj

Personal details
- Born: 6 March 1975 (age 51) Tirana, People's Socialist Republic of Albania
- Education: University of Tirana

Marsida Xhaferllari (born 6 March 1975) is an Albanian judge. She has been justice of the Constitutional Court of Albania since 2019 and served as its acting chairwoman in 2023 and in 2025.

== Early life ==
Xhaferllari was born on 6 March 1975 in Tirana, People's Socialist Republic of Albania. In 1997 she graduated with a law degree from the University of Tirana and in 2000 from the School of Magistrates, as part of the school's first graduating class.

== Career ==
She served as a judge in the Fier Judicial District between 1999 and 2007, after which she became an assistant to the minister, Director-General of the Directorate for Codification and Director-General for Judicial Affairs at the Ministry of Justice. Since 2005, she has been a lecturer at the School of Magistrates. In 2013, she was appointed Chief Inspector of the High Council of Justice.

She has also been a member of working groups on the country's judicial system, serving between 2015 and 2016 on the expert group on judicial reform, where she was primarily responsible for the judiciary and the funding of the justice system.

On 13 November 2019 Albanian president Ilir Meta signed the decree appointing her as a justice of the Constitutional Court. She took office on 14 November 2019 before president Meta, succeeding Altina Xhoxha. Her appointment came at a time when the court's functioning was compromised by the resignation of three judges and a dispute between Meta, prime minister Edi Rama, and the Socialist Party over the appointments. For that reason, on 15 November 2019 the Parliament passed a resolution declaring that Xhaferllari's appointment was an “invalid and unprecedented” act and “an attempt to block and drag out the process of forming the Constitutional Court" and appointed Arta Vorpsi to fill the same vacancy; she took the oath of office before a notary. In light of this conflict between institutions, the Venice Commission analyzed it at the request of president Meta.

In February 2022, Xhaferllari voted against the impeachment of president Meta. On 25 January 2023, as Xhaferllari was the senior judge of the Court, she became acting president of the Court following the retirement of Vitore Tusha and concluded her term on 20 February with the appointment of Holta Zaçaj. After the reitrment of Zaçaj on 10 March 2025, Xhaferllari assumed as the acting chairwoman once again, until the election of Fiona Papajorgji on 18 December 2025.
