= Fiona Papajorgji =

Chairwoman of the Constitutional Court of Albania (since 2025)

- Papajorgji pictured in 2026

Chairwoman of the Constitutional Court
- Incumbent
- Assumed office 18 December 2025
- Preceded by: Holta Zaçaj; Marsida Xhaferllari (acting)

Personal details
- Born: 12 March 1976 (age 50) Vlorë, People's Socialist Republic of Albania
- Education: University of Bari

Fiona Papajorgij (born 12 March 1976) is an Albanian jurist who has been servin as chairwoman of the Constitutional Court of Albania since 2025. She has been justice of the Constitutional Court since 2019.

== Career ==
Papajorgji was born 12 March 1976 in Vlorë, People's Socialist Republic of Albania. She graduated in law in 2000 for the University of Bari in Italy and got a PhD in law two years later. In Bari, Papajorgji worked as lawyer between 2000 and 2008.

She later began working at the Constitutional Court of Albania, first as lawyer of the Directorate of Research, Studies and Publications, between 2009 and 2011, and later as legal advisor between 2011 and 2019. Papajorgji has been professor of public law since 2007 at several universities and is the author of several articles of constitutional law.

In 2019, Papajorgji became lecturer of the School of Magistrates.

The Parliament of Albania appointed Papajorgji as justice of the Constitutional Court on 11 November 2019 with 105 votes for and 3 against. She was sworn on 14 November 2019 to succeed Bashkim Dedja. On 18 December 2025, the Assembly of Judges of the Constitutional Court appointed her as the new chairwoman of the Constitutional Court for a three-year term, succeeding Holta Zaçaj. Papajorgji was the sole candidate in the race.
