= President of the Supreme Court =

- President of the Supreme Court of Spain
- President of the Supreme Court of the United Kingdom
- President of the Supreme Court of Albania
- President of the Supreme People's Court of China
- Chief Justice of the United States
