= Judiciary of Albania =

National court system

The judiciary of Albania is the court system of Albania, which interprets and applies Albanian law. Albania's judicial system is a civil law system divided between courts with regular civil and criminal jurisdiction and administrative courts. It is governed by the High Judicial Council (Këshilli i Lartë Gjyqësor), aided by the office of the President of Albania, the Ministry of Justice, and the various courts' chairpersons.

The judiciary is defined by the national constitution (Kushtetuta) with a hierarchical structure, with the Constitutional Court (Gjykata Kushtetuese) and the Supreme Court (Gjykata e Lartë) at the apex. The District Courts (Gjykatat e Rrethit Gjyqësor) are the primary trial courts, and the Courts of Appeal (Gjykatat e Apelit) are the primary appellate courts.

The system is plagued by a lack of confidence from the public, backlogs spanning years, corruption, political attacks and attempts to undermine the independence of judges, and underfunding.

In 2016, cross-party support resulted in a wide-ranging reform effort, including the introduction of the vetting law. This also resulted in the creation of SPAK, and the corresponding "special courts" of first instance and appeal, operating in parallel to the regular civil/criminal courts.

== Hierarchy ==
Map of judicial districts of Albania (since 2023)

Articles 135 - 145 of the Constitution of the Albanian Republic provide the basic framework for the organization of the Courts System. These provisions, coupled with applicable laws have given rise to the following system:

First Instance Courts

- District Courts, which have initial jurisdiction for both criminal (excluding serious crimes) and civil (excluding administrative disputes) cases. Their territorial jurisdiction extends to their respective Districts.
- Court of First Instance for Serious Crimes, deals with Serious Crimes and has territorial jurisdiction over the entire territory of the Republic of Albania.
- Administrative Court of First Instance, there are 6 Courts dealing with administrative law disputes, each responsible for their respective District.

Intermediate Courts

- Courts of Appeal, which can review the decisions of lower courts for both criminal (excluding serious crimes) and civil (excluding administrative disputes) cases. Their territorial jurisdiction extends to given areas as defined by the President of Albania.
- Court of Appeals for Serious Crimes, which hears appeals for Serious Crimes and has territorial jurisdiction over the entire territory of the Republic of Albania.
- Administrative Court of Appeals, which hears appeals for administrative law disputes and has territorial jurisdiction over the entire territory of the Republic of Albania.

Highest Courts

- Supreme Court of Albania, which hears appeals through the Civil Chamber, Penal Chamber and Administrative Chamber. In cases of great complexity or when giving a unifying decision for all lower courts to follow, the Supreme Court Judges hold court as part of a Unified Chamber.
- Constitutional Court of Albania, interprets the Constitution and hears cases concerning alleged abuses of Human Rights.

== See also ==
- Politics of Albania
- Prosecutor General (Albania)
- SPAK
- EURALIUS
- Corruption in Albania
