= Vitore Tusha =

Albanian lawyer and judge (born 1960)

Chairwoman of the Constitutional Court of Albania
- In office 17 December 2018 – 25 January 2023; Acting: 17 December 2018–7 January 2021
- Preceded by: Bashkim Dedja
- Succeeded by: Holta Zaçaj; Marsida Xhaferllari (acting)

Personal details
- Born: 26 November 1960 (age 65) Tirana, People's Socialist Republic of Albania
- Education: University of Tirana

Vitore Tusha (born 26 November 1960) is an Albanian lawyer and judge. She served as a judge on the Constitutional Court of Albania between 2008 and 2023, and as its President between 2018 and 2023. Between 2018 and 2021, she held the post on an interim basis due to a dispute over appointments and in the midst of judicial reform.

== Early life and education ==
Tusha was born on 26 November 1960 in Tirana, People's Socialist Republic of Albania. She graduated with a law degree from the University of Tirana in 1983 and obtained her PhD in 1997.

== Career ==
Between 1983 and 1990, Tusha worked as a court clerk at the Triana District Court. She then practised as a lawyer for two years, before beginning her judicial career in 1992 as a judge at the Tirana District Court and subsequently, between 1994 and 2001, at the Court of Cassation. In this latter post, in November 1995 Tusha rejected the request for early release from prison of former prime minister Fatos Nano, although subsequent amendments to the penal code allowed him to be released from prison before serving his full 12-year sentence. Since 1986, she has been a lecturer in civil law and civil procedure at the University of Tirana and the School of Magistrates.

In 2004, Tusha became Vice-President of the National Chamber of Advocates. As a legal scholar, she co-authored the draft Code of Civil Procedure. She is a member of the Judicial Appointments Council, of which she was vice-chair.

Tusha was appointed a justice of the Constitutional Court of Albania in March 2008. Tusha has become a well-known judge for ruling that high-profile issues such as the maritime agreement are unconstitutional, and for upholding the constitutionality of the law on background checks. Amid judicial reform and a general review of the judges of the Constitutional Court, Tusha’s term of office was approved and extended in April 2018, as it expired.

Following the dismissal of chairman of the Constitutional Court Bashkim Dedja on 17 December 2018, Tusha became the sole justice of the Court and, as she was also the longest-serving member, she subsequently served as acting chair until the Court regained a quorum in late 2020. Consequently, newly appointed judges decided on 7 January 2021 that Tusha would continue exercising the powers of chairwoman.

Tusha was succeeded by Holta Zaçaj as justice of the court on 25 January 2023 when she retired. She was formally succeeded as chairwoman of the court on 20 February 2023 by Zaçaj.
