= Holta Zaçaj =

Albanian lawyer and judge (born 1976)

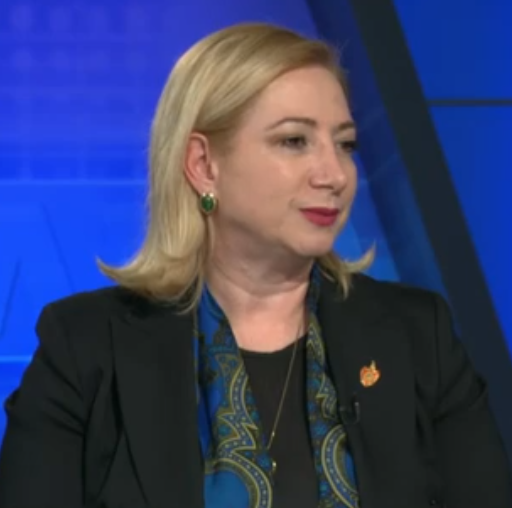
- In a 2024 interview

Chairwoman of the Constitutional Court
- In office 20 February 2023 – 10 March 2025
- Preceded by: Vitore Tusha; Marsida Xhaferllari (acting)
- Succeeded by: Fiona Papajorgji; Marsida Xhaferllari (acting)

Personal details
- Born: 12 January 1976 (age 50) Tirana, People's Socialist Republic of Albania
- Education: University of Tirana; Georgetown University

Holta Zaçaj (born 12 January 1976) is an Albanian lawyer and judge, who was the chairwoman of the Constitutional Court of Albania between 2023 and 2025. She served as justice of the Constitutional Court between 2023 and 2025.

== Early life ==
Zaçaj was born on 12 January 1976 in Tirana, People's Socialist Republic of Albania. She got a degree in law from the University of Tirana in 1998 and a master's degree in titles and financial regulations from the Georgetown University (USA) in 2008 thanks to a Fulbright Program.

She began working as a lawyer in 1999 at the Peace through Justice Centre, investigating war crimes in Kosovo and subsequently worked on free legal aid projects, particularly involving minors, at the Tirana Public Prosecutor's Office and with refugees. Since 2008, Zaçaj worked at some law firms in Albania and Massachusetts.

== Career ==
Between 2009 and 2013, Zaçaj worked as a lecturer at the School for Magistrates and between 2009 and 2014 as a lecturer in banking and finance law at several private Albanian universities. She has also worked as a legal expert for UNICEF delegations in Albania, Kosovo and Georgia, as well as for international organisations such as the IMF, the World Bank and the Council of Europe. Between 2013 and 2018 she led the legal affairs department of the Alpha Bank in Albania.

She is the author and co-author of at least 30 publications on human rights, children's rights, family law, banking and real estate law, as well as the Albanian Family Code, the Law on the Rights and Protection of Children in Albania and the juvenile prison laws in Kosovo.

On 16 January 2023, the Supreme Court elected Zaçaj as justice of the Constitutional Court, and was sworn in on 25 January 2023, succeeding Vitore Tusha, who retired. In the third round of voting, the Assembly of Judges elected Zaçaj as President of the Constitutional Court on 20 February 2023 to succeed Vitore Tusha.

In an interview with El Mundo on 26 May 2025, Zaçaj acknowledged as a major achievement the constitutional reform that overhauled the Albanian judicial system to ensure the independence of the judiciary, as well as the fact that the entry of the Balkan countries into the European Union was a good opportunity for Europe to become stronger.

On 10 December 2024, she announced that she would ask the Venice Commission to interpret the duration of her term of office, since neither the Albanian Constitution nor the order by which she was appointed justice determined an exact date for the end of her term, as she was appointed with the partial mandate to finish what Tusha left unfinished when she retired, and 2025 was to be her last year. After months of debate, on 23 December 2024, the Constitutional Court rejected Zaçaj's proposal to seek an opinion from the Venice Commission and confirmed the date announced by the Supreme Court when it announced the vacancy on 10 March 2025 as the last day of Zaçaj's term of office. Zaçaj had stated on 12 December 2024 that her term of office would end at the end of 2025. Marsida Xhaferllari assumed as the acting chairwoman, until the election of Fiona Papajorgji on 18 December 2025.
