= EURALIUS =

EU technical assistance project

- Consolidation of the Justice System in Albania
- Formation: 2005; 20 years ago
- Dissolved: 2021; 4 years ago
- Type: EU technical assistance
- Headquarters: Ministry of Justice, Tirana, Albania
- Official language: English; Albanian
- Website: www.euralius.eu

EURALIUS, also known as the Consolidation of the Justice System in Albania, was a technical assistance project funded by the European Union that sought the strengthening of the Albanian judiciary. EURALIUS focused on improving and guaranteeing the independence, transparency, efficiency, accountability and public trust in the Albanian judicial system, in line with the EU acquis. EURALIUS was composed of long-term international experts from various EU member states and of Albanian jurists who act as national experts, as well as support staff consisting of project assistants, translators, etc.

The transformation of the Albanian justice system toward EU standards is a condition of the country's path towards EU accession. The process aims to restore the public's confidence in the courts, as well as strengthen the rule of law according to the provisions of the Stabilization and Association Agreement. The EU had devised specific instruments in order to facilitate the country's accession and fulfillment of the conditions.

Among the Albanian project partners and beneficiaries were the Ministry of Justice, the judiciary, the High Council of Justice (since dissolved), the Prosecution Office, the Parliament of Albania, the Office for the Administration of the Judicial Budget, the School of Magistrates, the National Chamber of Advocacy and the National Chamber of Notaries.

== The project through the years ==
EURALIUS insignia

Since Albania submitted its application for European Union membership, it had to meet the membership criteria and key priorities set out in the Commission's Opinion. One of the major requirements for the EU membership is the Functioning of the Judiciary. Therefore, the Commission Report on Albania (2015) has stated that: "Albania's judicial system is at an early stage of preparation. Besides, the perception of the public toward the justice system in Albania is very low.

To consolidate the justice in Albania and to strengthen the transparency, efficiency and the public trust in the Albanian justice system, the EU funded the EURALIUS project. Initially, the project was operating under the Albania CARDS 2002 programme in the form of the EURALIUS I mission. Then, during the period 2007-2010, the project was undertaken by the EURALIUS II mission.

The project contractor for the first two missions was the Austrian Federal Ministry of Justice and managed by the Center of Legal Competence (CLC). The main objective remained to development of a more independent, neutral, effective, proficient, transparent and modern justice system in Albania, therefore contributing to the restoring of people's confidence in their institutions.

Euralius III started on 15 September 2010 and was finalized on 15 June 2013. This mission was managed by International and Ibero-American Foundation for Administration and Public Policies (FIIAPP) and had similar objectives as the previous missions.

EURALIUS IV started in September 2014 and ended in March 2018. EURALIUS IV implementation was awarded to a consortium led by the German Deutsche Stiftung für Internationale Zusammenarbeit e.V. (IRZ), in cooperation with the Dutch Center for International Legal Cooperation (CILC) and the Austrian Agency for Economic Cooperation and Development (aed), which are all mandated bodies of respective Ministries of Justice.

The main objective of the project was to assist the Albanian justice institutions in bringing their enactment closer to the EU standards. Except from supporting the work on judicial reform, the project was also charged with implementing a diverse array of objectives, arranged around the following components: Justice Reform and Organization of the Ministry; High Council of Justice (HCJ) and High Court; Criminal Justice and Prosecution Office; Judicial Administration and Efficiency; Legal Professions; Change Management; High Judicial Inspectorate (HJI); Court Organisation and Management; High Prosecutorial Council and Prosecution Offices; and Judicial Training.

EURALIUS V started in April 2018 and ended in December 2021. Following the comprehensive justice reform accompanied by EURALIUS IV, EURALIUS V focused on supporting the justice institutions to consolidate the justice system. The project was implemented by a consortium composed of the German Foundation for International Legal Cooperation (IRZ) as Lead Partner. IRZ is mandated by the Federal Ministry of Justice and Consumer Protection. Junior partners were the Dutch Center for International Legal Cooperation (CILC), Austrian Agency for Economic Cooperation and Development (aed) and the Italian High Council for the Judiciary (CSM).

EURALIUS V concentrated its assistance on five main areas of intervention, namely legal initiatives and capacity building of the Ministry of Justice and Parliament; Justice Governance institutions; Consolidation of courts, prosecutions offices and free legal professions; Information technology in the justice sector and judicial training.

== Justice Reform ==
EURALIUS played an important role in the consolidation of the justice system in Albania, especially through the contribution of the EURALIUS IV mission in the setting up of the Justice Reform process. Throughout the reform, the international and national experts have assisted the process of drafting the Albanian legislation, amendments to the laws in the justice sector and supported the set up and strengthening of Albanian institutions. A pivotal part of the Justice Reform process was the approval of the constitutional amendments by the Albanian Assembly on 21 July 2016, and of the legislative package of Organic Reform Laws, with the most important being the Law on the Transitional Re-evaluation of Judges and Prosecutors of the Republic of Albania.
