= Vetting law =

Albanian legislation on evaluating judges

Parliament of Albania
- Long title: On the transitional re-evaluation of judges and prosecutors in the Republic of Albania
- Citation: no. 84/2016
- Passed: 2016-08-30
- Enacted: 2016-09-23
- Committee responsible: Special Parliamentary Committee on Reform in the Judicial System

Summary
- Establish procedures for the re-evaluation of the performance and wealth of judges and prosecutors
- Status: Current legislation

The vetting law (Albanian: Ligji i veting-ut), officially law no. 84/2016, "On the transitional re-evaluation of judges and prosecutors in the Republic of Albania", (Note: Albanian: Për rivlerësimin kalimtar të gjyqtarëve dhe prokurorëve në Republikën e Shqipërisë) is an Albanian law allowing for the evaluation of judges and prosecutors and their dismissal after a review was completed by a panel of appointed "commissioners". It was developed through cooperation between all major political parties in the Albanian parliament and several international actors after the unanimously approved constitutional amendments that allowed for its creation. The law was ultimately passed in August 2016 with the votes of the governing coalition and independents.

The vetting law was one of the most important components of the judicial reforms of 2016 that represented the biggest overhaul to Albania's judicial system since the fall of communism in the country. The Independent Commission of Qualification was set up to conduct checks on the moral character, professional performance, and wealth of judges and prosecutors in Albania with other bodies responsible for monitoring the process and handling appeals.

During the first period of evaluations, around 800 judges and prosecutors were subject to the vetting process, over 200 of which were subsequently dismissed.

From January 2025, ongoing evaluations previously run by the Independent Commission will be carried out by SPAK.
