= List of ambassadors of Albania to Germany =

The People's Socialist Republic of Albania established post-war diplomatic ties with the Federal Republic of Germany for the first time on September 15, 1987. Both countries would exchange ambassadors on October 2 of that same year. Three weeks later, on October 23, 1987, the German minister of foreign affairs Hans-Dietrich Genscher paid an official six-day visit to Albania.

== List of diplomatic representatives of Albania to Germany (1987–present) ==
No.	Name	Title	Term served	
1	Shpëtim Çaushi	Ambassador	1987	1990
2	Xhezair Zaganjori	Ambassador	1992	1997
3	Bashkim Zeneli	Ambassador	1998	2002
4	Agim Fagu	Ambassador	2002	2005
5	Gazmend Turdiu	Ambassador	2005	2008
6	Valter Ibrahimi	Ambassador	2009	2014
7	Artur Kuko	Ambassador	2014	Present

== Notes ==
- Rauf Fico served as Albanian Minister to Berlin between 1938 and 1939.
- Rrok Gera was appointed ambassador to Germany when the Regency Council nominated him in July 1944. Gera however never served his term.
