= Lefter Goga =

Albanian politician (1921–1997)

- Lefter Goga

21st Speaker of the Parliament of Albania
- In office 20 December 1963 – 10 September 1966
- Preceded by: Medar Shtylla
- Succeeded by: Abdyl Këllezi

Prosecutor General
- In office 1966–1970
- Preceded by: Aranit Çela
- Succeeded by: Dhori Panariti

31st Minister of Finance of Albania
- In office 28 October 1974 – 11 November 1976
- Prime Minister: Mehmet Shehu
- Preceded by: Aleks Verli
- Succeeded by: Haki Toska

Personal details
- Born: May 6, 1921
- Died: 21 November 1997 (aged 76)

Lefter Goga (6 May 1921 – 21 November 1997) was an Albanian politician. Elected deputy of the National Assembly in 1954 representing the District of Durrës, he went on to serve 7 consecutive terms until 1982. Goga became a member of the Central Committee joining in 1966 at the 5th Party Congress and on that same year was appointed to the post of the "First Secretary of the Party" in the District of Krujë. He served as Chairman of the Assembly of the Republic of Albania from 1963 – 1966, as Prosecutor General from 1966 – 1970 and later as Finance Minister from 1974 – 1976.
