= Ina Rama =

Prosecutor General of Albania

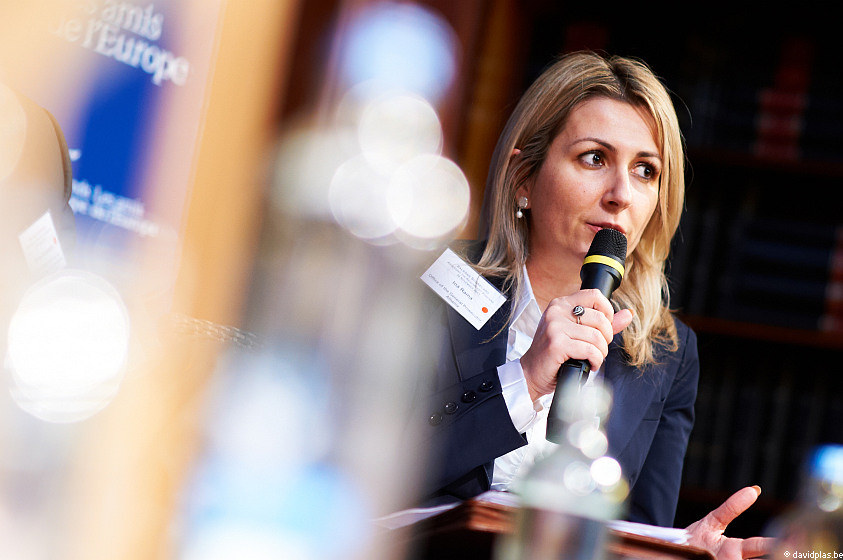

Prosecutor General of Albania
- In office 22 November 2007 – 21 November 2012
- President: Bamir Topi, Bujar Nishani
- Preceded by: Theodhori Sollaku
- Succeeded by: Adriatik Llalla

Personal details
- Born: 21 November 1972 (age 53) Durrës, Albania
- Education: University of Tirana
- Occupation: Attorney

Ina Rama (born 21 November 1972 in Durrës) was the Prosecutor General of the Republic of Albania from 2007 to 2012.

She was appointed in 2007 to replace Theodhori Sollaku, who had been removed from office through a procedure later ruled unconstitutional by the Constitutional Court of Albania. Nevertheless, Rama was not removed from office in order to restore Sollaku.

Rama is an external lecturer at the Aleksandër Moisiu University.

Preceded by Theodhori Sollaku	Albanian Prosecutor General; 2007–2012	Succeeded by Adriatik Llalla
