= Action Against Trafficking in Persons and Smuggling of Migrants in Nigeria =

A-TIPSOM
- Formation: 2018
- Headquarters: Abuja
- Website: https://atipsom.com/

Action Against Trafficking in Persons and Smuggling of Migrants in Nigeria (A-TIPSOM Nigeria) is an 11th European Development Fund project which is implemented in Nigeria by the International and Ibero-American Foundation for Administration and Public Policies (FIIAPP).

A-TIPSOM is a program designed to reduce trafficking in persons (TIP) and smuggling of migrants (SOM) at the national and regional level with specific emphasis on women and children in Nigeria. A-TIPSOM is anchored by FIIAPP.

== History ==
A-TIPSOM was founded in 2018 through an agreement between the European Union Delegation (EUD) and the Government of Nigeria, and is funded by the European Union (EU).

== Mission and objectives ==
The A-TIPSOM project is developed to:

- Improve governance of the migration sector in Nigeria, with a specific focus on the fight against TIP and SOM;
- Enhance prevention of TIP and SOM in key states of origin and of transit.
- Improve protection, return, and reintegration of victims of trafficking and of smuggling from Europe
- Enhance identification, investigation, and prosecution of traffickers and smugglers
- Promote more effective cooperation at the national, regional, and international levels in fighting TIP and SOM.

== Technical advisors and Coordinators ==
A-TIPSOM engages the following technical advisors and experts for their project implementation:

- Policy: Belo Omotosho
- Prevention: Joseph Sanwo
- Protection: Nurat Lawal
- Prosecution: Sani Dantuni
- Partnership: Ugo Ogbunude
- Community and Communication: Joseph Osuigwe
- Institutional Coordinator: Jose Nsang Andeme
- Technical Coordinator: Rosa Maria Bruges
- Support Officer: Alba Martos Rosa

== Team Leaders ==
- 2018-2022: Rafael Rios Molina.
- 2022-present: Federico Millan

A-TIPSOM is in partnership with various non-governmental and governmental organizations to engage in various activities which include the rescue of victims of human trafficking, anti-human trafficking campaigns, and training. A-TIPSOM's programs operate in areas known as the five P's: policy, prevention, protection, partnership and prosecution.
