= Institution of Public Commissioners (Albania) =

Albanian judicial organization

Institution of Public Commissioners Institucioni i Komisionerëve Publikë
- Location: Tirana, Albania
- Authorised by: Constitution of Albania
- Website: ikp.al/en/home-page-2/

Commissioners
- Currently: Darjel Sina; Florian Ballhysa

The Institution of Public Commissioners (IKP) (Albanian: Institucioni i Komisionerëve Publikë) is an independent entity that plays an appellate role in the vetting process of judges and prosecutors in Albania's justice system.

The purpose of the Public Commissioners is to represent the public interest in the transitional reassessment process of judges and prosecutors through the exercise of the right to appeal against the decisions made by the Independent Qualification Commission.

Guided by the principles of impartiality, independence, due process, transparency and cooperation, the Commissioners conduct the re-evaluation process while respecting the confidentiality and protection of personal data of each candidate.

The IKP was established under Article 179/b of the Constitution. The mandate of the Public Commissioners is 5 years from the date of commencement of the institution's operations. During their term in office the Commissioners enjoy the status of a High Court judge.
