= HIDAACI (Albania) =

Inspektoriati i Lartë i Deklarimit dhe Kontrollit të Pasurive dhe Konfliktit të Interesave
- Official logo

Agency overview
- Formed: 2003
- Website: www.ildkpki.al

The High Inspectorate of Declaration and Audit of Assets and Conflicts of Interest (HIDAACI; Albanian: Inspektoriati i Lartë i Deklarimit dhe Kontrollit të Pasurive dhe Konfliktit të Interesave) is a government agency in Albania under the supervision of the Inspector General. The task of the agency is to administer the audit of the declaration of assets of public individuals.
