= Politics of Albania =

Albania is a unitary parliamentary constitutional republic, in which the president of Albania is the head of state and the prime minister of Albania is the head of government in a multi-party system. The executive power is exercised by the Government and the prime minister with its Cabinet. Legislative power is vested in the Parliament of Albania. The judiciary is independent of the executive and the legislature. The political system of Albania is laid out in the 1998 constitution. The Parliament adopted the current constitution on 28 November 1998. Historically Albania has had many constitutions. Initially constituted as a monarchy in 1913, Albania became briefly a republic in 1925, and then a authoritarian monarchy in 1928. In 1939 Albania was invaded by Fascist Italian forces, imposing a puppet state, and later occupied by Nazi German forces. Following the partisan liberation from the Nazis in 1944 a provisional government was formed, which by 1946 had transformed into a communist one-party state. In March 1991 democracy was restored with multi-party elections.

The president represents the unity of the Albanian people in the country and abroad as the head of state and is also the commander-in-chief of the military. The president is nominated through a secret vote and without debate by the Parliament of Albania by a majority of three-fifths of all its members and is in every case elected for five years. The president maintains regular and coordinated operation and stability of the national government system, safeguards the independence and territorial integrity of Albania and appoints prime ministers on the basis of the balance of power in the Parliament. The prime minister is appointed by the president after each parliamentary election and must have the confidence of the Parliament to stay in office. The prime minister is elected on the basis of universal suffrage, through a secret ballot, for a four-year term. The constitution sets no limit as to office terms of the prime minister. The prime minister is de facto the most powerful and influential person in Albanian politics. However, in the absence of the prime minister, the deputy prime minister takes over his functions, such as chairing the cabinet and the council of ministers of Albania.

The Parliament is a unicameral legislative body of Albania. It is vested in both the government as well as in the parliament. The number of representatives is 140, which are elected by popular vote to serve four-year terms. The oldest parliament with extant records was held on 2 March 1444, forged in Lezhë under Gjergj Kastrioti Skënderbeu as the leader against the Ottoman Empire. Since 1991, the introduction of pluralism, the party system is dominated by the Democratic and the post-communist Socialist. Parliamentary elections are held every four years, the most recent in 2021. In April 2021 parliamentary election, ruling Socialist Party, led by Prime Minister Edi Rama, secured its third consecutive victory, winning nearly half of votes and enough seats in parliament to govern alone. In February 2022, Albania's Constitutional Court overturned parliament's impeachment of President Ilir Meta, opponent of the ruling Socialist Party.

Albania is a member state of the North Atlantic Treaty Organization and also an official candidate for membership in the European Union.

The Economist Intelligence Unit rated Albania a "flawed democracy" in 2024, in conjunction with the regime type of "autocratic grey zone" given by V-Dem in 2026.

== Executive ==
Main office-holders
Office	Name	Party	Since
President	Bajram Begaj	Independent	24 July 2022
Prime Minister	Edi Rama	Socialist Party	13 September 2013
Deputy Prime Minister	Albana Koçiu	Socialist Party	6 March 2026

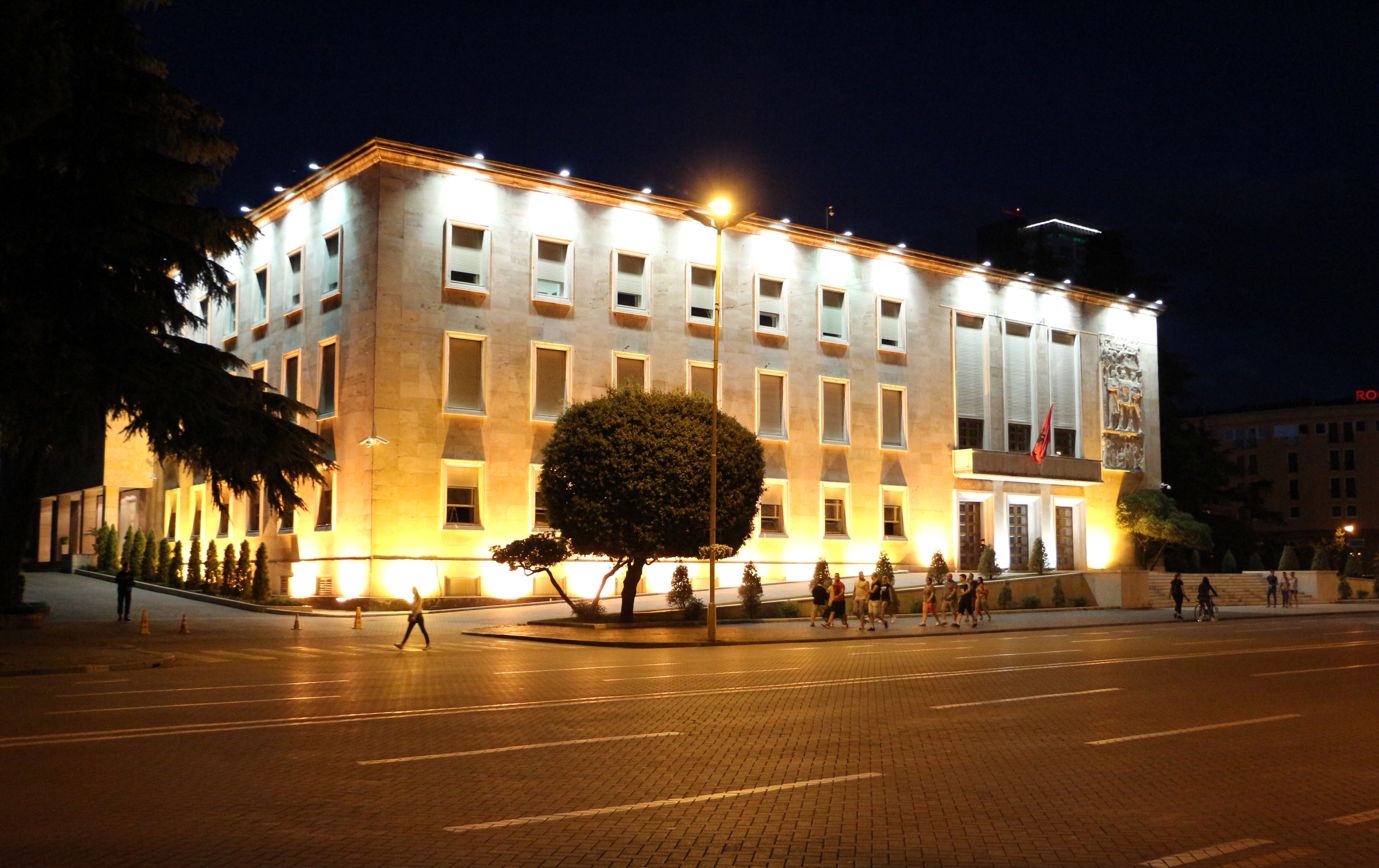
The Kryeministria serves as the office and residence of the Prime Minister. It is also the seat of the Council of Ministers in Tirana.

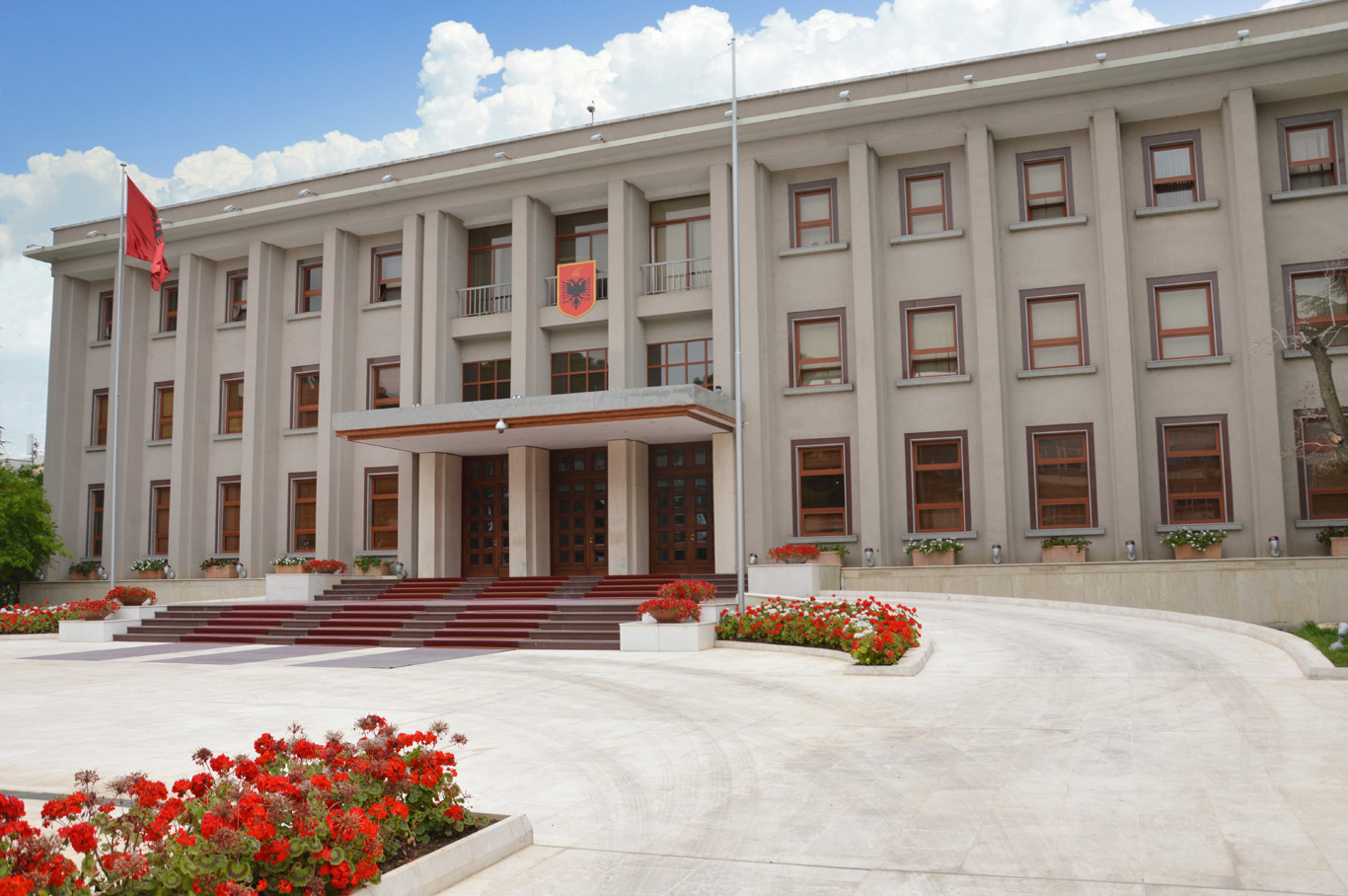
The Presidential Office, the official workplace of the President.

Since the Declaration of Independence in 1912, Albania has experienced different models of governance, including an international protectorate, a monarchy, a state-party regime and the parliamentary republic as well. Throughout all this period, the function of the head of state has been exercised in various forms.

Nowadays, the President of Albania (Presidenti) is the head of state, commander-in-chief of the military and the representative of the unity of the Albanian people. The president is indirectly elected to a five-year term by the Parliament by secret vote, requiring a three-fifths majority of the votes of all members. The president has the power to guarantee observation of the Constitution and all laws, act as commander-in-chief of the Albanian Armed Forces, exercise the duties of the Parliament, when the Parliament is not in session, and appoint the Prime Minister. The president has the power to declare war, to grant pardon and to conclude agreements of peace, alliance, and participation in international organizations; upon the request of the government a simple parliamentary majority is required to ratify such actions, agreements, or treaties.

The prime minister of Albania (Kryeministri) is the head of government. According to the Constitution, the prime minister is the most senior minister of cabinet in the executive branch of government in the Albanian parliamentary system. The prime minister is appointed by the president; ministers are nominated by the president as well on the basis of the prime minister's recommendation. The Council of Ministers is responsible for carrying out both foreign and domestic policies. It directs and controls the activities of the ministries and other state organs. The deputy prime minister of Albania (Zëvendëskryeministri) is the deputy head of government. In the absence of the prime minister, the deputy prime minister takes over his functions, such as chairing the Cabinet and the Council of Ministers.

== Legislative ==
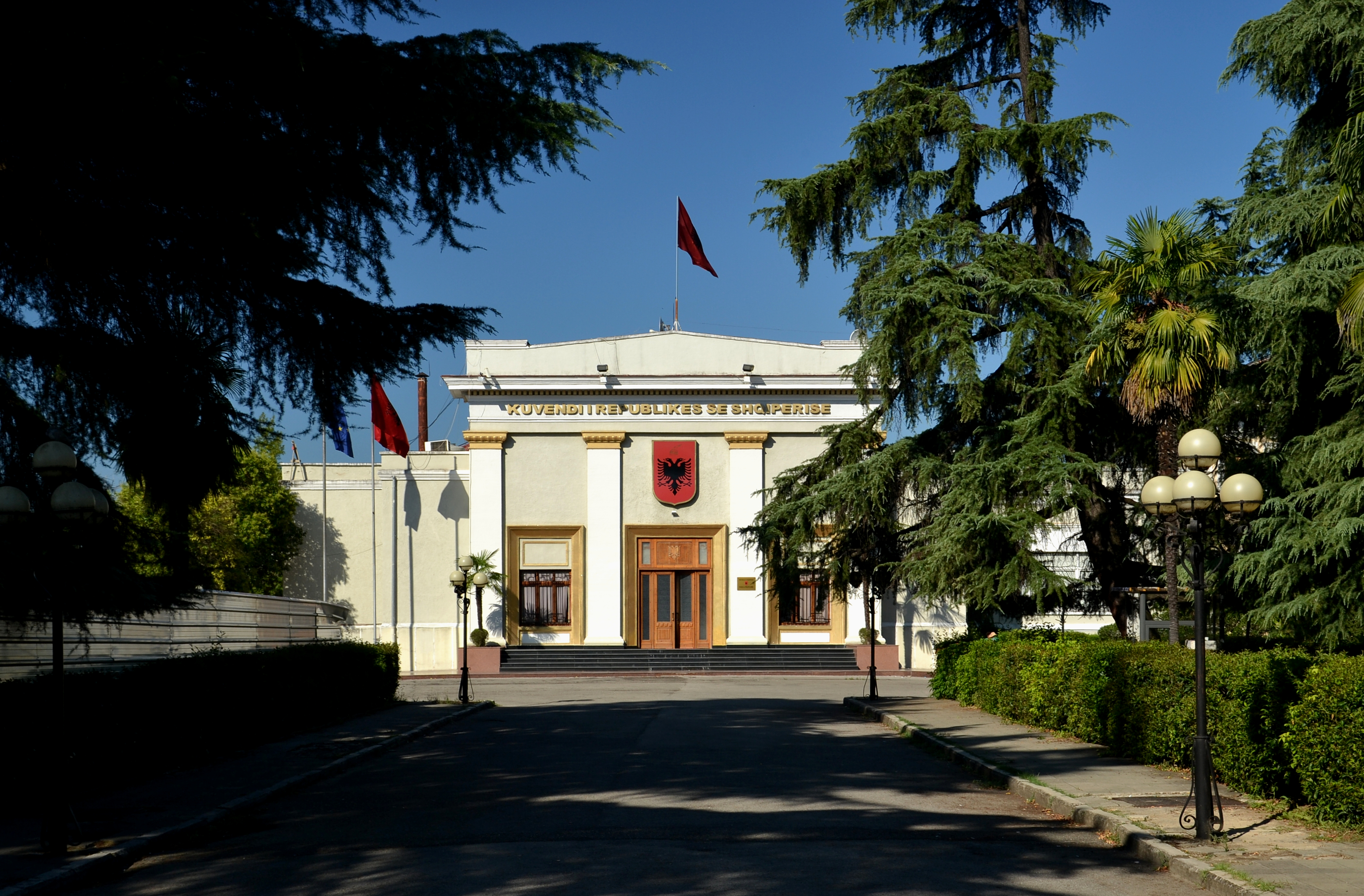
The Kuvendi serves as the seat of the Parliament of Albania.

The Parliament of Albania (Kuvendi i Shqipërisë) is a unicameral legislative body. It is composed of not less than 140 members elected to a four-year term on the basis of direct, universal, periodic and equal suffrage by secret ballot. As of Article 45 of the Constitution, which guarantees the right to vote, the people of Albania exercise their power through their elected representatives in the Parliament. When the Parliament is elected, the first session shall be held no later than 20 days after the completion of elections with the president as the speaker. There are 15 permanent committees. Extraordinary meets can be called by the president, by the Chairperson of the Parliament, by the prime minister or by the one fifth of the members. Decisions are made based on a majority vote if more than half of the members are present, except in cases where the Constitution provides for a special majority. As specified by the current electoral legislation in Albania, 140 members of the Parliament are elected in multi-seat constituencies. Within any constituency, parties must meet a threshold of 3 percent of votes, and pre-election coalitions must meet a threshold of 5 percent of votes. All laws passed by the Parliament are published through the Fletorja Zyrtare, the official journal of the government.

The chairperson of the Parliament (Kryetar i Kuvendit) is the presiding officer of the Parliament and is elected by the members of the Parliament. The official function is to moderate debate, make rulings on procedure, announce the results of votes, decides who may speak and has the powers to discipline members who break the procedures of the chamber or house. When the president is temporarily absent or incapable of exercising its powers, the chairperson takes over his functions.

== Judiciary ==
Albania follows the civil law tradition, which is based on the French law system. It has a three-tiered, independent judicial system governed by the constitution and national legislation enacted by the Parliament. The judicial branch of Albania is divided into three main institutions; the 'Highest Courts', which includes the Supreme Court (Gjykata e Lartë) and the Constitutional Court (Gjykata Kushtetuese), the 'Intermediate Courts' such as the Courts of Appeal (Gjykata e Apelit), Court of Appeals against corruption and organized crime (Gjykata e Apelit kundër Korrupsionit dhe Krimit të Organizuar), and the Administrative Court of Appeals (Gjykata Administrative e Apelit) as well as the 'First Instance Courts' such as the District Courts (Gjykata e Juridksionit të Përgjithshëm) and the Court of First Instance against corruption and organized crime (Gjykata e Shkallës së Parë kundër Korrupsionit dhe Krimit të Organizuar).

The Supreme Court is the highest court of appeal in Albania; its hearings are open and judgments are made publicly, except in cases where the privacy of the accused is to be protected. It is composed of nineteen judges such as the president of the Supreme Court and eighteen members of the Supreme Court. The judges are selected and appointed amongst judges with more than 10 years of seniority or prominent lawyers, who have exercised their activity for more than 15 years. The members can serve for a single term of nine years, without the right of reappointment. The Constitutional Court is the final authority for the interpretation of the Constitution and the compliance of laws in accordance with the constitution.

== Elections ==
Following the collapse of the communist regime in the nation, the first multi-party elections were held in 1991, simultaneously with the 1991 parliamentary elections. The 1998 Constitution of Albania guarantees the right to vote without restriction due to sex, race, social status, education level, or wealth. Every Albanian citizen who has reached the age of 18 has the right to vote. Regular elections take place for the office of the president, parliamentary, county prefects, county assemblies, city and municipal mayors and city and municipal councils.

The president is elected through a secret vote and without debate by the Parliament by a majority of three-fifths majority of all its members, for five years. The Constitution sets a limit to a maximum of two terms in office. The Parliament is elected to a four-year term in twelve multi-seat constituencies analogous to the 12 county borders, with amendments to achieve a uniform number of eligible voters in each constituency to within 3%. Within the constituencies, seats are elected by closed list proportional representation, with an electoral threshold of 3% for parties and 5% for alliances. Seats were allocated to alliances using the d'Hondt system, then to political parties using the Sainte-Laguë method.

The county prefects and city and municipal mayors are elected to four-year terms by majority of votes cast within applicable local government units. A runoff election is held if no candidate achieves a majority in the first round of voting. Members of county, city, and municipal councils are also elected to four-year terms through proportional representation.

== Parties ==
Albania has a multi-party system, with numerous parties in which no one party often has a chance of gaining power alone, and parties must collaborate in order to form coalition governments. The two major parties are the Socialist Party of Albania (PS) and the Democratic Party of Albania (PD). Albania also has a number of minor parties. Following is a list of political parties with elected representation at the national level in the Parliament following the general parliamentary elections of 2021.

Name	Abbr.	Ideology	Leader	Seats
Socialist Party of Albania; Partia Socialiste e Shqipërisë	PS	Centre-left, social democracy, Third Way, progressive, Western, modernism, social liberalism	Edi Rama	74
Democratic Party of Albania	PD	Centre-right, liberal conservatism, conservatism, nationalism, pro-Europeanism, economic liberalism	Sali Berisha	59
Freedom Party of Albania	PL	Centre-left, social democracy, progressivism	Ilir Meta	4
Social Democratic Party	PSD	Social democracy, centre-left	Tom Doshi	3
Legality Movement Party; Partia Lëvizja e Legalitetit	PLL	Right-wing, monarchism Social conservatism	Shpëtim Axhami	2

In the 2023 Albanian local elections the Democratic Party of Albania (PD) were not allowed to register their candidates, a court upheld that decision accordingly the Socialist Party of Albania (PS) won most seats.

== Foreign policy ==
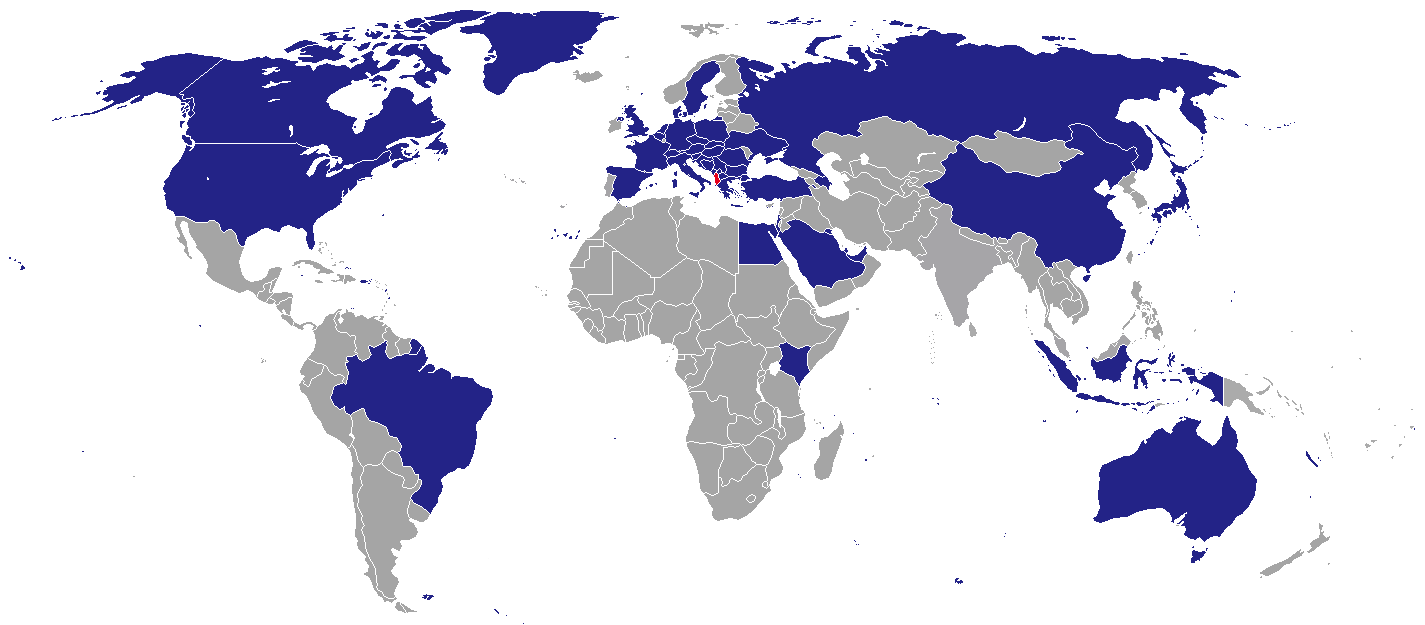
The countries with diplomatic missions of Albania.

Foreign policy is conducted through the Ministry of Foreign Affairs in Tirana. Albania maintains a network of 50 diplomatic missions abroad and holds relations with more than 115 countries. It is a member of the North Atlantic Treaty Organization (NATO), United Nations (UN), Council of Europe, International Monetary Fund (IMF), World Bank and several others. Citizens of the country have visa-free or visa on arrival access to 98 countries and territories, with the Albanian passport ranking 55th in terms of travel freedom according to the Henley visa restrictions index. Today, Albania maintains strong diplomatic relations with such countries as the United States, Italy, Brazil, Greece, Austria, Croatia, China, Germany, Portugal, the United Kingdom, Turkey, Kuwait and Switzerland.

Since the collapse of communism in 1990, the country has extended its responsibilities and position in European and international affairs, supporting and establishing friendly relations with other nations. The main objectives are the accession of Albania to the European Union; the international recognition of Kosovo; the recognition of the expulsion of Cham Albanians; and helping and protecting the rights of Albanians in Montenegro, Macedonia, Greece, southern Serbia, Italy and the Albanian diaspora.

Furthermore, the country became one of the first eastern European countries to join the North Atlantic Treaty Organization. Politicians of Albania considered admission to NATO as a top priority for the country. Since 1992, it has been extensively engaged with NATO, and has maintained its position as a stability factor and a strong ally of the United States and European Union in the Balkans. At the April 2008 summit in Bucharest, NATO agreed to the accession of Albania and Croatia. One year later in April 2009, both countries joined the alliance. Although, the country received candidate status for the European Union membership in 2014, based on its 2009 application. Today, Albania plays a central role in the negotiation of the Berlin Process.

== Administrative divisions ==
With a total area of 28,748 square kilometres (11,100 square miles), Albania is divided into twelve administrative counties (Albanian: Qarqe). The counties are further subdivided into 61 municipalities (Bashkia). In addition, the counties were further subdivided in 36 districts (Rrethe), which became defunct in 2000.

The counties were created on 31 July 2000 to replace the thirty-six former districts. The government introduced a new administrative division to be implemented in 2015, whereby municipalities were reduced to 61, while rural ones called (Komuna) are abolished. The defunct municipalities are known as Neighborhoods or Villages (Lagje or Fshat). There are overall 2980 villages or communities in the entire country, formerly known as localities (lokalitete). The municipalities are the first level of local governance, responsible for local needs and law enforcement. As part of the reform, major town centers in the country were physically redesigned and façades painted to reflect a more Mediterranean look.

County		Capital	Population	Area
1	Shkodër County (Qarku i Shkodrës)	Shkodër	215,483	3,562
2	Kukës County (Qarku i Kukësit)	Kukës	84,035	2,374
3	Lezhë County (Qarku i Lezhës)	Lezhë	135,613	1,620
4	Dibër County (Qarku i Dibrës)	Peshkopi	134,153	2,586
5	Durrës County (Qarku i Durrësit)	Durrës	278,775	766
6	Tirana County (Qarku i Tiranës)	Tirana	811,649	1,652
7	Elbasan County (Qarku i Elbasanit)	Elbasan	298,913	3,199
8	Fier County (Qarku i Fierit)	Fier	312,448	1,890
9	Berat County (Qarku i Beratit)	Berat	139,815	1,798
10	Gjirokastër County (Qarku i Gjirokastrës)	Gjirokastër	70,331	2,884
11	Vlorë County (Qarku i Vlorës)	Vlorë	183,105	2,706
12	Korçë County (Qarku i Korçës)	Korçë	221,706	3,711

== See also ==
- Censorship in Albania
- History of Albania
- Presidents of Albania
- Prime Ministers of Albania
- Shoqata Mbarëkombëtare e të Përndjekurve Politikë Shqiptare
