= Independent Qualification Commission (Albania) =

Albanian constitutional entity

- Komisioni i Pavarur i Kualifikimit
- Official logo
- Jurisdiction: Albania
- Location: Tirana
- Authorised by: Constitution of Albania
- Website: Official Website

Chief Commissioner
- Currently: Genta Tafa (Bungo)

The Independent Qualification Commission (KPK) (Albanian: Komisioni i Pavarur i Kualifikimit) is a constitutional entity directly responsible for the assessment and re-evaluation of judges, prosecutors, inspectors, legal advisors and other members of Albania's justice system.

The main duties of the KPK are as indicated in Article 179/b of the constitution:

... all judges, including members of the Constitutional Court and the Supreme Court, all prosecutors, including the Prosecutor General, members of the High Council of Justice, members of the High Prosecutorial Council, the Chief Inspector and inspectors of the High Council of Justice and all legal advisors of the Constitutional Court and the Supreme Court shall be assessed and re-evaluated in order to re-establish public trust and confidence in these essential democratic institutions.

Headquartered in the former building of "The League of Writers and Artists" in Tirana, the Commission is chaired by the Chairperson and consists of 12 commissioners, organized into 4 panel judges composed of 3 members, who are selected by allotment.
