= Theodhori Sollaku =

Theodhori Sollaku (born 1962 in Fier, Albania) was the Prosecutor General of the Republic of Albania from 2002 to 2007. He was appointed on March 29, 2002, to replace Arben Rakipi, who had been removed from office through a procedure later ruled unconstitutional by the Constitutional Court of Albania. Nevertheless, Sollaku was not removed from office in order to restore Rakipi.

During Sali Berisha's presidency in the 1990s, Sollaku served as the President's Legal Advisor.

Preceded by Arben Rakipi	Albanian Prosecutor General; 2002–2007	Succeeded by Ina Rama
