= International and Ibero-American Foundation for Administration and Public Policies =

Spanish public sector foundation

Foundation for the Internationalisation of Public Administration Fundación para la Internacionalización de las Administraciones Públicas
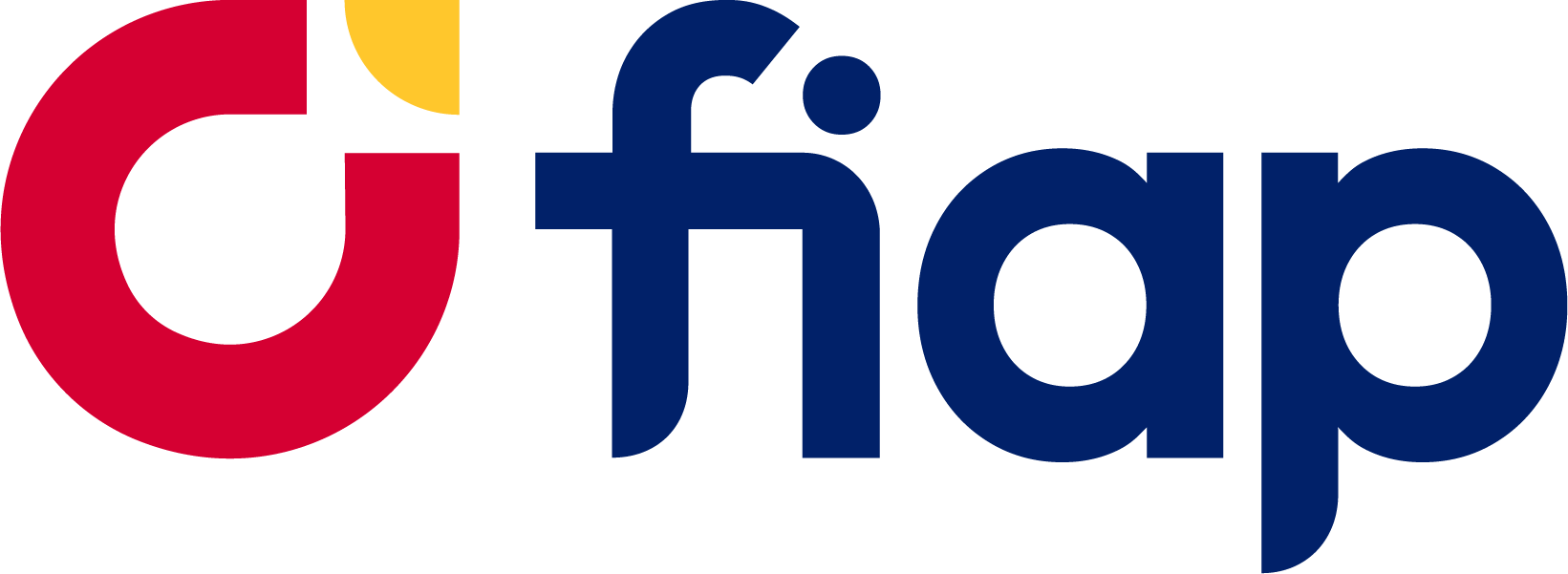
- Industry: Public organization
- Founded: 1998
- Headquarters: Madrid, Spain
- Area served: Worldwide
- Owner: Government of Spain
- Website: www.fiap.gob.es

The Foundation for the Internationalisation of Public Administration (Spanish: es:Fundación para la Internacionalización de las Administraciones Públicas, FIAP) is a public sector foundation under the Spanish state and a member institution of Cooperación Española, the Spanish government cooperation agency. It works to improve public systems in more than 100 countries by managing international cooperation projects.

FIAP operates within the framework of Spanish foreign policy, and the foundation supports the international activity of the Spanish Administration in its priority geographic and action areas.

== Origin ==
The foundation was formed in 1998, under the name Ibero-American Government and Public Policy Foundation, [Fundación Iberoamericana de Gobierno y Políticas Públicas], with the mission of working on technical cooperation with public administrations in other countries, fundamentally Ibero-America.

In 2000 it was merged with the Ibero-American Institute of Public Administration Foundation [Fundación Instituto Iberoamericano de Administración Pública] (created in 1997), giving rise to the International and Ibero-American Foundation for Administration and Public Policies (FIIAPP).

In March 2025 the name was changed into FIAP. Today FIAP is an integral part of the Spanish Cooperation system, and manages technical cooperation projects funded by the European Union and the Spanish Ministry of Foreign Affairs and Cooperation.

== Projects ==
The Foundation for the Internationalisation of Public Administration works at the service of public administrations by managing the participation of their various agencies in technical cooperation projects, thereby promoting their internationalisation and Brand Spain.

FIAP manages international cooperation projects oriented towards improving public administrations in the countries where it works. It does so through the exchange of experiences between Spanish experts and their counterparts in the beneficiary institutions of the countries where it works. FIIAP together with Estonian e-Governance Academy implements the EU4DigitalUA project to support Ukrainian digital transformation and harmonisation with the EU Digital Single Market.

In addition, it dedicates some of its efforts to other activities, such as producing studies on administrations and public policies (R&D+i), as well as training public sector employees.

FIAP is the institution in Spain with responsibility for managing the Twinning programme of the European Union and is the eligible body, along with AECID and COFIDES, for managing EU delegated cooperation projects. As such, it is part of the European cooperation system.

== Board ==
FIAP's governing body is its Board, which consists of a president, members and a secretary.

The presidency is held by the vice-president of the Spanish Government.

The members are government ministers, secretaries of state and senior officials of the Spanish General State Administration (AGE).

The office of secretary of the board is held by the director of the foundation.

The FIAP Board has a Permanent Commission chaired by Spain's Secretary of State for International Cooperation and Ibero-America and the Caribbean.

== Objectives ==
FIAP manages international technical cooperation projects at the service of administrations with the aim of improving public systems in the countries where it works. It constitutes an instrument for sharing the experiences and good practices of the Spanish Administration and for improving public policy models. It contributes to promoting and consolidating relationships of trust with the administrations of other countries and with international institutions.

== FIAP's scope of action ==
FIAP manages projects in the following areas:

- Social policies and rights: social protection, health, education and employment
- Governance and modernisation of public administrations
- Migration and mobility
- Economy and public finances
- Development and communications policies
- Green economy: climate change, energy, agriculture and fisheries
- Security and the fight against organised crime
- Justice and transparency

== See also ==
- Action Against Trafficking in Persons and Smuggling of Migrants in Nigeria, implemented by FIAP
- Network Against Child Trafficking, Abuse and Labour
