= Prosecutor General (Albania) =

Highest judicial authority for criminal prosecutions in Albania

- Incumbent; Olsian Çela since 6 December 2019
- Style: His Excellency
- Appointer: nomination by President
- Term length: 7 years (by new Constitution 2016)
- Formation: 26 January 1945
- Website: pp.gov.al

In Albania, the Prosecutor General (Albanian: Prokurori i Përgjithshëm) is the highest judicial authority exercising the criminal prosecution of entities or individuals and representing the accusation in court on behalf of the state. They are also responsible for carrying out a series of other duties assigned by law to the prosecution. Its powers are defined by the Constitution of 1998 as amended in 2016 by the law "On the Organization and Functioning of Institutions for Combating Corruption and Organized Crime."

The General Prosecutor proposes to the President of the Republic the candidates for prosecutor after considering the opinion of the Council of Prosecution. They are entitled to issue orders for the prosecutor's suspension from exercise of their duty when the starting of a criminal proceeding against them has been decided, until the end of the proceeding, or when a serious disciplinary violation is uncovered.

In the exercise of their competencies, prosecutors operate in accordance with the Constitution and laws. They exert their competencies by respecting the principles of fair, equal and legal proceedings and safeguarding human rights, interests and legal freedoms.

The Prosecution is organized and working under the direction of the General Prosecutor as a centralized structure, composed of the Office of the General Prosecutor, the Council of the Prosecution and the prosecutors of the judiciary system.

== Prosecutors ==
No.	Name	Term in office
1	Bedri Spahiu	26 January 1945	1949
2	Siri Çarçani	12 June 1951
3	Aranit Çela	21 June 1958	November 1966
4	Lefter Goga	November 1966	22 November 1970
5	Dhori Panariti	22 November 1970	23 November 1982
6	Rrapi Mino	23 November 1982	6 May 1991
7	Petrit Serjani	14 May 1991	6 May 1992
8	Maksim Haxhia	6 May 1992	17 September 1992
9	Alush Dragoshi	7 December 1992	12 August 1997
10	Arben Rakipi	12 August 1997	19 March 2002
11	Theodhori Sollaku	29 March 2002	5 November 2007
12	Ina Rama	22 November 2007	3 December 2012
13	Adriatik Llalla	3 December 2012	18 December 2017
14	Arta Marku	18 December 2017	6 December 2019
15	Olsian Çela	6 December 2019	Incumbent

== See also ==
- Part X of the Albanian Constitution
