= Chief Justice of Albania =

Chief Justice of the Supreme Court
- Kryetari i Gjykatës së Lartë
- Seal of the Supreme Court
- Incumbent; Sokol Sadushi since September 2020
- Nominator: Bujar Nishani
- Appointer: Albanian Assembly
- Succession: Assumes viceregal duties upon the death or incapacitation of the President
- Salary: 190.000 lekë
- Website: gjykataelarte.gov.al

The chief justice of Albania, officially known as the president of the Supreme Court of Albania (Albanian: Kryetari i Gjykatës së Lartë) is the most senior judge of the Supreme Court of Albania, who presides over every activity of the institution: he approves the internal regulations and the structure of the court, issues orders and directives of an administrative nature, supervises the support function, presides the bench in the United College, appoints the members of the court into distinct Colleges, employs and dismisses Judicial Assistants as well as the court's administrative staff and oversees the management of the annual budget of the court.
