= Bashkim Dedja =

Albanian judge (born 1970)

Bashkim Dedja (born March 13, 1970) is the former head of the Constitutional Court of Albania.
