= Albanian School of Magistrates =

School of Magistrates of the Republic of Albania
- Shkolla e Magjistraturës së Republikës së Shqipërisë
- Logo of the Albanian School of Magistrates
- Motto: Edukim për Drejtësi
- Motto in English: Education for Justice
- Type: Public
- Established: 1997
- Affiliations: Supreme Court of Albania
- Director: Sokol Sadushi
- Location: Tirana, Albania
- Campus: Urban
- Website: www.magjistratura.edu.al

The Albanian School of Magistrates, officially known as the School of Magistrates of the Republic of Albania (Albanian: Shkolla e Magjistraturës së Republikës së Shqipërisë) is an Albanian post-graduate school, where Albanian judges and public prosecutors are trained. The institution was established in 1997 through no. 8136, date 31.7.1996 "On the School of Magistrates of the Republic of Albania", which has since been amended several times. It is located in Tirana, with its campus located inside the Tirana Grand Park, sharing premises with the Faculty of Geology and Mining of the Polytechnic University of Tirana.

== School activities ==
The aim of the training provided by the ASM is to form a corps of judges and public prosecutors who are suitable for all posts on the bench as well as in the public prosecution service in first instance courts. A prospective Judge or Public prosecutor must complete a Bachelor in Law (which typically requires three years of study) and a Master in Law (which requires two years of study) before entering the School of Magistrates. Admission is made through a two-part entrance examination.

The Albanian School of Magistrates offers:

- initial professional theoretical and practical education of candidates for magistrate (who select either the Judicial or the Prosecutorial stream);
- professional continuous formation of judges and prosecutors in function of general character, combined with the specialized formation for professionals who are in duty in such courts as the administrative court, the serious crimes court, as well as of the sections of courts which are focused into the judgment of specific matters, such as commercial sections, bankruptcy sections, task force of the prosecution, etc.;
- the realization of the activities of the professional formation of the employees of the judicial administrate, as well as of other professions related with the justice system, in accordance with the law or on the request of interested institutions, in dependence of free capacities, as well as of the funds it has in disposal from responsible institutions or donors;
- editions and publications;
- scientific research and preparation of analysis, memo and expertise from Legal and Scientific Clinics of the School of Magistrates, (candidates for magistrate under the observation of their professors), in the support of the judicial institutions, such as the High Court, the Constitutional Court and the General Prosecutor's Institution, as well as in the support of the drafting process for the Parliament and the Ministry of Justice.

== Initial training ==
The Initial Training Formation of candidates for magistrates is made up of a period of three years:

- a theoretical year with different law subjects
- a practical year guided by a school professor and a judge or prosecutor with high qualifications
- a professional internship year dealing with less complicated cases guided by a prosecutor or a judge.

The first year theoretical program is common for all candidates whereas the second practical year and the third year of professional internship are carried out according to the careers of each of the candidates, judges or prosecutors. School Director announces the list of courts and prosecutors’ offices, where the internship will be conducted, the responsible magistrates and names of candidates for each court or prosecutor's office.

At the end of the first and second year, an evaluation is made from the Pedagogical Council for each of the candidates, with 5 (five) scales: Excellent, Very Good, Good, Sufficient, Insuficcient. Evaluation rules and procedures are defined in the Internal Regulations of the School of Magistrates.

Based on this evaluation, the President of the Republic upon the proposal of the High Council of Justice and General Prosecutor, appoints temporarily candidates for magistrates to carry out their professional internship, respectively as judges and prosecutors.

== Continuous training ==
In the context of the fulfillment of its mission the School of Magistrates offers the continuous education for judges and prosecutors of courts and prosecutions of the first instances and appeal courts.

The period of the continuous education is not more than 20 days per year and not more than 60 days in five years.

The program of continuous education is composed from the Director of the School in collaboration with the internal pedagogical staff after is taken, preliminarily, the opinion of the Head of the High Court, of the General Prosecutor, of the Minister of Justice, of the High Council of Justice and of the Pedagogical Council of the School. The program of the continuous education is approved from the Directive Council of the School.

Participation in these trainings is compulsory.
