= District courts of Albania =

The district courts of Albania (Albanian: Gjykatat e Rrethit Gjyqësor) are the courts of first instance in Albania, providing the first level of justice for civil and criminal matters in the Albanian judiciary.

== Courts ==
At present there are 23 district courts throughout Albania, which are composed of 251 judges. These courts are as follows:

- District Court of Berat
- District Court of Dibër
- District Court of Durrës
- District Court of Elbasan
- District Court of Fier
- District Court of Gjirokastër
- District Court of Kavajë
- District Court of Korçë
- District Court of Krujë
- District Court of Kukës
- District Court of Kurbin
- District Court of Lezhë
- District Court of Lushnjë
- District Court of Mat
- District Court of Përmet
- District Court of Pogradec
- District Court of Pukë
- District Court of Sarandë
- District Court of Shkodër
- District Court of Tirana
- District Court of Tropojë
- District Court of Vlorë

In conjunction with the 22 District Courts that have jurisdiction over their appointed region, there is a Court of First Instance with nationwide jurisdiction in Albania:

- Court of First Instance for Serious Crimes.
