= Constitutional Court of Albania =

Highest authority in Albania's legal system

Constitutional Court of Albania Gjykata Kushtetuese e Shqipërisë
- Interactive map of Constitutional Court of Albania; Gjykata Kushtetuese e Shqipërisë
- 41.321915°N 19.819790°E
- Established: 29 April 1992
- Jurisdiction: Albania
- Location: Tirana
- Coordinates: 41.321915°N 19.819790°E
- Composition method: Executive, legislative & judicial selection
- Authorised by: Constitution of Albania
- Judge term length: 9 years Non-renewable
- Number of positions: 9
- Website: www.gjykatakushtetuese.gov.al

President
- Currently: Fiona Papajorgji Chairworman
- Since: 18 December 2025

The Constitutional Court of the Republic of Albania (Albanian: Gjykata Kushtetuese e Republikës së Shqipërisë) is the highest authority in Albania's legal system that defends and assures the respect of the Constitution of Albania.

The judges of the Constitutional Court, also known as members, deal with the following common cases: the compatibility of an international agreement that has not yet been ratified with the mandates of the Constitution; the compliance of a law passed by either a local, a regional or the central level of government in Albania with the Constitution; a dispute pertaining to a violation or violations of a constitutional right or constitutional rights of an Albanian citizen or citizens.

In the first two decades of its operation, the Constitutional Court has encountered several criticisms. Some of the criticism directed at the Constitutional Court has concerned the process in which the judges of the said court are appointed and elected, and the decisions made by the aforementioned court on the Parliament of Albania's revision of provisions.

== Role ==
In accordance with Section 1 of Article 131 of the Constitution, it is the Constitutional Court's role to pronounce judgments on the following:

- The compatibility of laws with the Constitution or with international agreements as covered in Article 122 of the Constitution.
- The compatibility of unratified international agreements with the Constitution.
- The compatibility of normative acts generated by the central and local bodies of government in Albania with the Constitution and international agreements.
- Any incompatibilities between the competences of the branches of government in Albania as well as between the competences of central and local levels of government in Albania.
- The constitutionality of Albanian parties and alternative political organisations, including their activities, as per Article 9 of the Constitution.
- The need to remove the President of Albania from office through the verification of the President's inability to carry out their duties.
- Any problems pertaining to the electable nature of the President, members of the Parliament and officials of the other organs referred to in the Constitution; any issues concerning the verification of the election of the President, members of the Parliament and officials of the alternative organs mentioned in the Constitution; any problems relating to the incompatibility between the duties of the President, members of the Parliament and officials of the other organs referred to in the Constitution.
- The constitutionality of referendums held in Albania and the verification of referendum outcomes.
- The complaints of individuals on their constitutional rights who have exhausted all other practical legal avenues in their opposition to any acts of public power or judicial acts that have impaired their constitutional rights, except if protection of the aforementioned rights is given by the Constitution.

=== Interpretation of the Constitution ===
The interpretation of the Constitution is one of the primary functions of the Constitutional Court. The Constitutional Court performs an interpretive role when an appropriate case on either an international agreement, a law or a violation of a constitutional right or rights is before the said court.

There are several reasons why the Constitutional Court has an interpretive function, one of which is so that the Constitutional Court can reaffirm the articles found in the Constitution. Another reason for the Constitutional Court's interpretive role is so that the Constitutional Court can clarify the articles contained in the Constitution. Such clarification guides Albanian public bodies in the use of their powers by providing them with a framework, one that conforms to the Constitution, to work within.

An example of the aforementioned framework is the production of constitutional standards for Albanian constitutional organs by the Constitutional Court. Constitutional standards formulated by the Constitutional Court ultimately form the basis of these institutions' actions.

== Composition ==
The Constitutional Court should be composed of nine judges as stated by Albanian law. Albanian law also states how individuals come by the position of judge of the Constitutional Court.

For example, Article 125 of the Constitution details parts of the process of judge renewal which, in accordance with the said article, should take place every three years when three judges of the Constitutional Court reach the end of their nine-year terms. In the early stages of the aforementioned process, the Justice Appointments Council chooses three eligible candidates for each opening for judge of the Constitutional Court by selecting the three highest-ranked individuals. According to Article 125 of the Constitution, for an individual to be eligible for candidacy for judge of the Constitutional Court, they must have obtained a law degree and must have had at least fifteen years' worth of professional experience in the legal profession as either a judge, prosecutor, professor or lecturer of law, senior civil servant in public administration, or as an advocate. In the latter stages of the said process, the President appoints an individual to fill the first opening for judge of the Constitutional Court, the Parliament elects an individual to fill the second opening and the Supreme Court elects an individual to fill the third opening. In the final stage of the aforementioned process, an individual swears an oath before the President to signify the start of their tenure as a judge of the Constitutional Court.

Of the nine judges who are in office, three judges should have been appointed by the President, three judges should have been elected by the Parliament, and three judges should have been elected by the Supreme Court over the course of several phases of judge renewal as per Article 125 of the Constitution.

=== President ===
The incumbent President of the Constitutional Court is also an incumbent judge of the said court. A judge of the Constitutional Court serves as the President of the aforementioned court for a term of three years with the right to only one re-election. For a judge of the Constitutional Court to become the President of the said court, they would have to be elected via a secret ballot having obtained a majority vote from all the judges in the aforementioned court.

== History ==
The historical background of the Constitutional Court is similar to the backgrounds of various other constitutional courts in Central and Eastern Europe. As was the case for Central and Eastern Europe, Albania experienced historical and democratic changes in the early 1990s. One such transformation was the establishment of constitutional courts.

=== Timeline of the Constitutional Court ===
- On 29 April 1992, the Constitutional Court was founded in Albania in accordance with Law Number 7561 ‘On an Addendum to Law Number 7491 of 29 April 1991 "On the Main Constitutional Provisions"'. 29 April 1992, also saw the institution of the Constitutional Court's powers, status, jurisdiction, composition and functioning as per Articles 17 to 28 of Law Number 7561. Additionally, Articles 17 to 28 of Law Number 7561 introduced the principles that the Constitutional Court must adhere to when handling constitutional matters. The need to protect the rule of law along with the rights and freedoms of individuals in a country that was transitioning to democracy were grounds for the Constitutional Court's inception.
- On 1 June 1992, after the first judges of the Constitutional Court each swore on oath before the President, the said court began to operate.
- On 15 July 1998, Law Number 8373 ‘On the Organisation and Functioning of the Constitutional Court of the Republic of Albania' was approved by the Parliament which set up a firm legal basis for the Constitutional Court's structure and operation. Law Number 8373 instigated alterations to the competences of the Constitutional Court, entities that are permitted to bring forth cases before the aforementioned court and the process of nominating judges of the said court.
- On 28 November 1998, the Constitutional Court's competences were amended with the promulgation of the 1998 Constitution.
- On 10 February 2000, the Parliament adopted Law Number 8577 ‘On the Organisation and Functioning of the Constitutional Court of the Republic of Albania' which solidified the Constitutional Court's organic law. The 10 February law covered the following subjects: the nomination and dismissal of incumbent judges of the Constitutional Court, the term lengths and status for judges of the aforementioned court, the submission of complaints to the said court, the time limits for the aforementioned complaints, the procedures on the inspection of the said complaints, the notification of parties during the proceedings of the aforementioned court, the operation of preliminary reviews and plenary sessions associated with the said court, and the adjudication of the aforementioned court's verdicts. Law Number 8577 was drafted with the help of the Venice Commission and rescinded Law Number 8373 after it came into effect.
- On 22 July 2016, the Parliament unanimously voted to amend the Constitution which led to changes in how the position of judge of the Constitutional Court is filled. After the 22 July revision to the Constitution, judges of the Constitutional Court are either appointed by the President, elected by the Parliament, or elected by the Supreme Court of Albania.

=== 2019 appointment of judges ===
Criticisms have been aimed at the Constitutional Court for issues that persist in the process of appointing and electing judges of the Constitutional Court. In 2019, one such issue involved the President of Albania, who was forced to violate Albanian constitutional court law due to the actions of the Justice Appointments Council and the Parliament. The said violation came about because of a series of events:

- On 8 October 2019, the Justice Appointments Council gave the President of Albania, Ilir Meta, two candidate lists for two vacancies in the Constitutional Court in which he had thirty days to appoint both according to Section 4 of Article 7/b of Law Number 8577.
- On 13 October 2019, the Justice Appointments Council sent two candidate lists for two vacancies in the Constitutional Court to the Parliament in which it had thirty days to elect both as per the Constitution.
- On 15 October 2019, Ilir Meta appointed Besnik Muçi as a judge for the first vacancy in the Constitutional Court. According to Section 2 of Article 179 of the Constitution, the Parliament should have elected a judge to fill in the second vacancy in the Constitutional Court before 7 November 2019, so that Ilir Meta could appoint a judge for the third vacancy before his thirty-day deadline ran out, but the Parliament failed to do so. As the President did not appoint a second judge for the Constitutional Court before 7 November 2019, the Parliament wrongly assumed that Arta Vorpsi, as the highest-ranked candidate on the second candidate list given to Ilir Meta, would fill the second vacancy in the Constitutional Court.
- On 11 November 2019, the Parliament elected Elsa Toska to fill the second vacancy and Fiona Papajorgji to fill the third vacancy in violation of the rotation mandated by Section 2 of Article 127 of the Constitution.

=== Presidents of the Constitutional Court ===
| No. | Name | Term in office |
|---|---|---|---|
| 1 | Rustem Gjata | 19 May 1992 | 14 March 1998 |
| 2 | Fehmi Abdiu | 23 April 1998 | 3 May 2004 |
| 3 | Gjergj Sauli | 3 May 2004 | 16 May 2007 |
| 4 | Vladimir Kristo | 23 May 2007 | 27 September 2010 |
| 5 | Bashkim Dedja | 27 September 2010 | 17 December 2018 |
| 6 | Vitore Tusha | 03 October 2008 | 20 February 2023 |
| 7 | Holta Zaçaj | 20 February 2023 | 20 February 2025 |

== Notable cases ==
=== 1997 pyramid scheme rulings ===
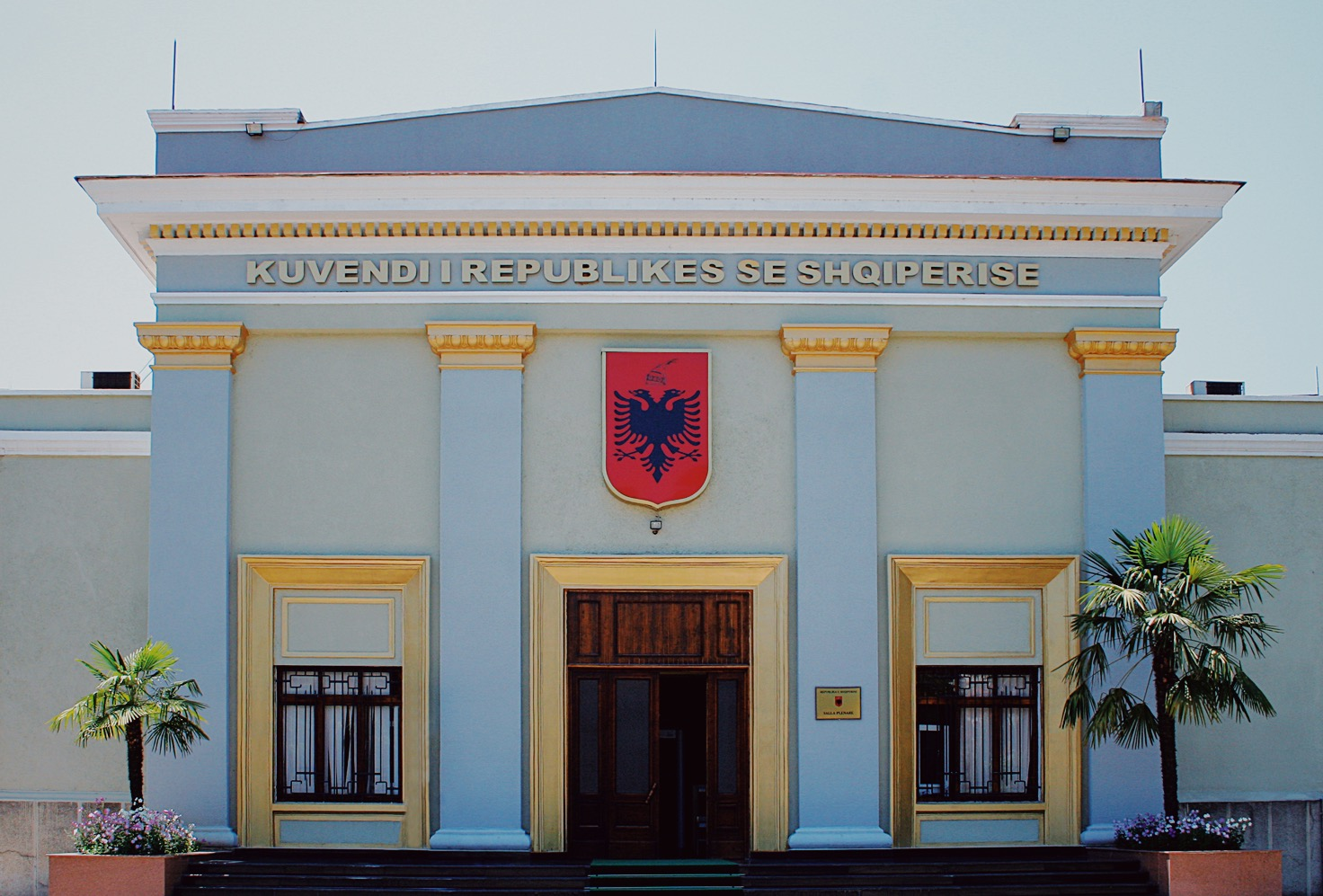
The Parliament of Albania

Criticisms have been levelled at the Constitutional Court for a series of controversial decisions made in November and December 1997 that pertained to the Parliament's amendment of provisions.

The first contentious decision made by the Constitutional Court in the final two months of 1997 was Verdict Number 53 in which the aforementioned court repealed a legal provision on 13 November. The legal provision related to the authorisation of government-nominated administrators to handle assets relating to pyramid schemes which swindled more than two-thirds of Albania's citizens.

After the Constitutional Court's fifty-third verdict of 1997, the new Government of Albania expressed concern over its ability to complete the termination of pyramid schemes through liquidation. The Parliament reacted by re-enacting the legal provision that was struck down by the Constitutional Court and revised a constitutional provision.

In response, the Constitutional Court sua sponte repudiated the Parliament's constitutional provision in Verdict Number 57 having maintained that it had supremacy over constitutional affairs. Verdict Number 57 was delivered on 5 December and was the Constitutional Court's second contentious decision in the final two months of 1997. Such a verdict by the Constitutional Court breached the Major Constitutional Provisions as the said laws indicate that the Parliament acted in accordance with its collective authority to amend constitutional provisions. The fifty-seventh verdict of 1997 also effectively vetoed the Parliament's authority to reply to verdicts of the Constitutional Court by revising constitutional provisions.

Following the Constitutional Court's Verdict Number 57, the Venice Commission was critical of the aforementioned court's 5 December decision. The Venice Commission stated that the Constitutional Court's 5 December verdict damaged the functioning of the said court by transgressing its authority and engaging in a political dispute with the Parliament.

Relations between the Constitutional Court and the Parliament were further politicised when the aforementioned parliament passed a resolution requiring the judges of the said court to rotate as per the Constitution. The Democratic Party of Albania denounced the approved resolution as the aforementioned party claimed that the Constitutional Court had acted within its constitutional right to function independently. Prior to the Parliament's resolution on judge rotation, the Constitutional Court was composed of judges that had been nominated by the previous Democratic-controlled parliament.

=== Impeachment of President Ilir Meta (2021–2022) ===
On 9 June 2021, the Parliament of Albania voted 104–7, with three abstentions, to impeach President Ilir Meta, following a parliamentary investigation that concluded he had violated sixteen articles of the Constitution and incited instability through public remarks favouring the opposition during the campaign for the April 2021 parliamentary election. Under the Constitution, the impeachment required ratification by the Constitutional Court.

On 17 February 2022, the Constitutional Court overturned Parliament's decision, ruling that the allegations against Meta did not amount to a "grave violation" of the Constitution and that there was no legal threshold for his removal from office; the ruling was final and not subject to appeal. Meta remained in office as President for the remainder of his term.

== See also ==
- Judiciary of Albania
- Politics of Albania
