= Supreme Court of Albania =

Highest court in Albania's judicial system

Supreme Court of Albania Gjykata e Lartë e Shqipërisë
- Official logo
- Interactive map of Supreme Court of Albania; Gjykata e Lartë e Shqipërisë
- 41.3258248°N 19.8165878°E
- Established: 10 May 1913
- Location: Tirana, Albania
- Coordinates: 41.3258248°N 19.8165878°E
- Authorised by: Constitution of Albania
- Judge term length: 9 years
- Number of positions: 17 (2016)
- Website: gjykataelarte.gov.al

Chief Justice of Albania
- Currently: Sokol Sadushi; Vice President
- Since: September 2020

The Supreme Court of the Republic of Albania (Albanian: Gjykata e Lartë e Republikës së Shqipërisë) is the highest court of Albania and is the final court of appeals in the country's judicial system. It is composed of seventeen judges: the Chief Justice and sixteen Members.

The Supreme Court is the highest court in the judicial branch of the country with its premises located in Tirana. Its main mission is to review the decisions of lower instance courts upon the appeal from one of the parties. It reviews the matter at hand dealing with only with issues of law, without judging the facts, thus guaranteeing through its jurisprudence uniformity in the application of the law and a unified judicial practice.

== History ==
The historical context of the development of the current Supreme Court can be divided in the following time periods.

=== 1912—1920 ===
The Declaration of Independence marked the first steps in institution-building for the nascent Albanian state. The Assembly of Vlora and the Government headed by Ismail Qemali amongst other important initiatives, such as the creation of the main legislative and executive institutions, also focused on organizing the Judiciary among Western European lines.

Thus on May 10, 1913 "The Canon of Jury" was approved; this first Act constituted a cornerstone for the organization and functioning of the courts in the Albanian judicial system. The "Canon of Jury" envisaged the creation of the Dictation Court, sub-districts Courts of First Instance Courts, which would be competent for civil matters and minor offenses, as well as the Peoples' Court, composed of a jury of common people who would adjudicate matters in criminal cases.

According to historical data, the jury system was implemented only once for a trial in the Province of Elbasan, but it failed to meet expectations and thus it was repealed on June 4, 1914. On that same day a new law was promulgated, which amended the Appeals process by establishing the Primary Appeals Court to serve as a corts of Second Instance and a supreme Dictation Court.

=== 1920—1939 ===
During the interbellum period 1920-1939, the most important issues for the strengthening of the rule of law in Albania concerned legal reform, the reorganization of the Judiciary and the increase of professional competency of its employees. It was during this period that the organization and functioning of the Judiciary in Albania was consolidated and its role strengthened.

In 1925, the Fundamental Statute of the Albanian Republic was approved by Parliament, stipulating in Article 102 that any Judge or Prosecutor would be appointed by the President of the Republic on the proposal of the Minister of Justice.

During the Albanian Republic, the Judicial system was organized as follows:

- Religious Courts - each recognized religion had its independent court. The decisions taken by these courts were enforced by the court execution offices included in the sub-district courts.
- Special Military Court - the first such court was created in the city of Shkodra. Its composition involved three Officers, two Lay judges and a civil Prosecutor. The jurisdiction of this Court covered all matters related to the disruption of public order, military officers who had fought against the Republican Guard as well as all those citizens who opposed the orders of government officials.
- Special Political Court - this court was headed by an officer and was composed of two judges and two other officers, elected by the Ministry of Justice and the Ministry of Internal Affairs respectively. The decisions issued by this court needed to be approved by the Minister of the Interior to become final and binding, whereas in the cases when the death penalty was to be imposed the approval of the Chair of Parliament was required.
- State Supreme Court - an ad hoc court composed of five Senators and the Heads of the Dictation Courts, competent to judge Minister's and high state officials' abuse of power, political crimes and allegations of "High Treason" against the State or the Sovereign.

In 1928, Albania transitioned from a Republican government into a Monarchy. As part of this Constitutional transformation, there were also significant changes in the organization of the Albanian Judiciary. For instance, the law "On the organization of the Judiciary", approved on 1 April 1929, sanctioned the division of courts as follows:

- Courts of the Peace - operated at the center of every district and sub-district and were divided into three categories, according to their respective power:
- Courts of First Instance - collegiate courts, exercising their jurisdiction within the boundaries of their respective District. These courts were divided into Primary Courts and Collegial Courts:
- Primary Courts - First Instance courts responsible for all penal cases that fell under the jurisdiction of the Courts of the Peace, provided that those offences had taken place within the District boundaries.
- Collegiate Courts - composed of the President of the court together with two Members, it had jurisdiction on all criminal cases that would qualify for a sentence of imprisonment of over three years.
- Dictation Court - the highest court in the land, it was divided into two Departments, respectively the Department of Civil Affairs and the Department of Penal Affairs. Every Department comprised a President, four associate Members, an assistant Member, a Registrar, all supported by secretaries, clerks and assistants. The Dictation Court also incorporated the Office of the Chief Prosecutor, who was assisted by a Deputy Chief Prosecutor, a secretary, an archivist and an assistant. The separate Departments of the Dictation Court could come together into a Unified Chamber, whose role was overseeing the fair distribution of justice and reviewing the performance of all judges.
- Council of State - During the Albanian Kingdom, the functions of a Supreme Administrative Court were exercised by the Albanian Council of State, which was divided into the Judicial section, Administration and Finance section and the Economy and Telecommunications section.

=== 1943—1990 ===
After the end of WWII, the newly formed Communist-controlled government reorganized the Judicial system once again. For this reason, the People's Assembly enacted in 1951 the Law "On the organization of the judiciary", created a Supreme Court, composed of the following four Colleges:

- Penal College
- Civil College
- Military College
- Disciplinary college

Each College was responsible for reviewing matters falling within its sphere and it sat as a judicial panel composed of the Chair of the College, one Member of the Supreme Court and two Judicial Assistants.

In contrast to the other Colleges, the Disciplinary College was concerned with adjudicating potential from Judges, Court Presidents, members of the Military Courts and members of the Supreme Court. The judicial panel consisted of the President and two members of the Supreme Court, or alternatively the Deputy President and two members as appointed by the President themself.

For certain important cases, the Supreme Court could hear cases en banc, where the President, the Deputy Heads of the court as well as all the members of the Supreme Court would be present.

The general judicial practice offered by the Supreme Court, served as a guide for lower courts decisions which needed to be compliant with the legislation in power, but also with Communist ideology and the political demands of the time.

=== 1991 - present ===
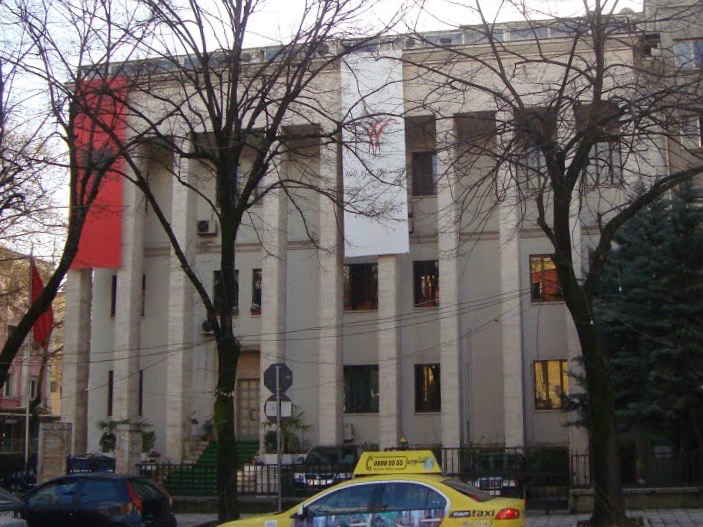
Façade of the Supreme Court.

With the fall of communism in Albania, a lot of changes needed to be made in the almost every area of life to adapt to the new system, including reforming the Judiciary as a whole.

In order to implement the Democratic principles of respecting the Rule of Law and equality before the law, the National Assembly approved on 29 April 1991 the Law No.7491 "On the Main Constitutional Provisions", which structured the Judicial system into a supreme Court of Cassation, the Courts of Appeals, the Courts of First Instance and the Military Courts.

According to the new law, the President and Deputy Chairmen of the Court of Cassation were elected by Parliament on the proposal of the President of the Republic, whereas the Judges were elected by the Parliament on the proposal of the Minister of Justice. All members of the Court would be elected for a term of 7 years with no right of reelection. The Court of Cassation could not assess any matters as a court of principal jurisdiction, but it could rule as a court of second instance on a few matters as stipulated by law.

The adoption of the Constitution of the Republic of Albania in November 1998, sanctioned a Judicial system of three Instances, providing that "The judicial power is exercised by the Supreme Court, the Appellate courts and the courts of first instance, which are established by law..." . The newly established Supreme Court would be composed of 17 members, appointed to office by the decree of the President of the Republic and the consent of the Assembly, they would serve for a term of 9-years without the right of reelection.

The Constitution sanctions the role of the Supreme Court as both of principal jurisdiction and as a court that reviews the decisions of the intermediate (appeals) courts. Therefore, in cases concerning penal charges against the President of the Republic, the Prime Minister and members of the Council of Ministers, members of the Parliament and Judges of the Constitutional Court, the Supreme Court acts as a court of first instance, while it acts as a court of last resort for all other cases.

On 15 March 2000 the National Assembly passed Law Nr. 8588 "On the Organization and Functioning of the Supreme Court of the Republic of Albania", which further improved the organization of the court and strengthened its status as an independent constitutional institution. By virtue of the law and an amendment in 2013 by Law Nr. 151, the Supreme Court is divided into a Civil College, a Penal College, an Administrative College, which have jurisdiction for a specified area, and the en banc United College.

When functioning as a court of last resort, the Supreme Court of Albania hears legal recourses from aggrieved parties and reviews the validity of decisions of the lower courts for the case aggrieved. In certain cases when the Supreme Court wants to clarify the interpretation of a given legal provision or change previous court practice, the court may form the Unified Colleges, in which all members hear the case en banc and its decision and interpretation of the law forms part of a unified judicial practice, which is binding on all lower courts and also on the decisions of the separate Colleges of said court.

The President of the Supreme Court is appointed by the President, after having been given the consent of Parliament and the members in office of the Supreme Court. The President presides under the same mandate that made the later a member of the Supreme Court. Besides their judicial functions, the President is the official representative of the institution and has the authority to appoint and dismiss Judicial Assistants and support staff, as well as to manage the funds allocated to the institution.

== Fire ==
On 17 October 2026, a fire affected part of the Supreme Court of Albania in Tirana during anti-government protests. CNA reported that the fire initially began on the first floor of a business adjacent to the court and spread to the institution's offices. Euronews Albania separately reported that protesters started a fire near the court and that flames affected areas on the building's first floor and two vehicles.

Following the fire, visible damage was reported inside the affected premises, including broken windows, burned tables and scattered files. SOT reported that a vehicle parked near the building was completely destroyed. Firefighters extinguished the flames and prevented the fire from spreading to other parts of the building.

Justice Minister Toni Gogu condemned the violence, expressed solidarity with the court's judges and staff, and stated that the Ministry of Justice was prepared to provide assistance within its legal powers while respecting judicial independence.

The incident occurred amid escalating anti-government protests in Albania, during which demonstrators clashed with police and public and private property was damaged. Protesters were demanding the resignation of Prime Minister Edi Rama.

== Judges ==
The Supreme Court is composed of 17 Members. Supreme Court Judges are selected and appointed amongst judges with more than 10 years of seniority or prominent lawyers who have exercised their activity for more than 15 years. The President of the Republic with the consent of Parliament appoints the Members of the Supreme Court. The members of Supreme Court can serve for a single term of 9-years, without the right of reappointment.

The Supreme Court of Albania consists of the following members (as of 2021):

- Sokol Sadushi (VicePresident)
- Ilir Panda
- Ervin Pupe
- Sokol Binaj
- Albana Boksi
- Sandër Simoni
- Klodian Kurushi
- Artur Kalaja
- Asim Vokshi

=== Law clerks ===
Members of the Supreme Court are assisted by up to two law clerks, who are officially referred as Judicial Advisors, and who help the judges by examining Appeal Court files, preparing memoranda where they express their opinion on the matters of case under review, responding to complaints, preparing the necessary court documents and performing any other tasks assigned by their judge.

Judicial Assistants are selected by the judges themselves and appointed by the President of the Supreme Court. In order to qualify for the position of Judicial Assistant, a candidate must be a lawyer who meets the legal criteria to be appointed as a judge of first instance or appellate courts.

== See also ==
- Politics of Albania
- Judiciary of Albania
