= Aranitas =

- Administrative unit
- Location within Albania
- Coordinates: 40°36′N 19°48′E
- Country: Albania
- County: Fier
- Municipality: Mallakastër

Population (2017)
  - Administrative unit: 2.714
- Time zone: UTC+1 (CET)
  - Summer (DST): UTC+2 (CEST)

Aranitas is a village and a former municipality in Fier County, Albania. During the 2015 local government reform it became a subdivision of the municipality of Mallakastër. The population at the 2011 census was 2,714. The name is derived from the Arianiti family, an Albanian noble family in the late Middle Ages.

== Notable people ==
- Xhemal Aranitasi, former commander in chief of the Royal Albanian Army, studied in the Monastir Military High School
- Mustafa Aranitasi (12 April 1872 – 26 April 1961) was an Albanian military commander and politician who served as Minister of War on two separate terms during the 1920s. A Zog loyalist, he played an important role in the reformation of the Albanian Army during this time period.
- Ali Shametaj, Albanian folk singer
