= Military ranks of the People's Socialist Republic of Albania =

The Military ranks of the People's Socialist Republic of Albania were the military insignia used by the Albanian People's Army. After the Second World War, the Military ranks of the Albanian Kingdom were abandoned and replaced with insignia and ranks inspired by the Soviet military ranks. Albania used these ranks until May 1966, when military ranks were abolished altogether following Chinese example and based on doctrines of guerrilla warfare.

== Commissioned officer ranks ==
The rank insignia of commissioned officers.

Rank group	General / flag officers			Senior officers			Junior officers
Albanian People's Ground Forces
Albanian People's Ground Forces	Gjeneral kolonel	Gjeneral lejtant	Gjeneral major	Kolonel	Nënkolonel	Mayor	Kapiten i parë	Kapitan	Toger	Nëntoger
Albanian People's Navy
Albanian People's Air Force
Albanian People's Air Force	Gjeneral kolonel	Gjeneral lejtant	Gjeneral major	Kolonel	Nënkolonel	Mayor	Kapiten i parë	Kapitan	Toger	Nëntoger
Rank group	General / flag officers			Senior officers			Junior officers

== Other ranks ==
The rank insignia of non-commissioned officers and enlisted personnel.

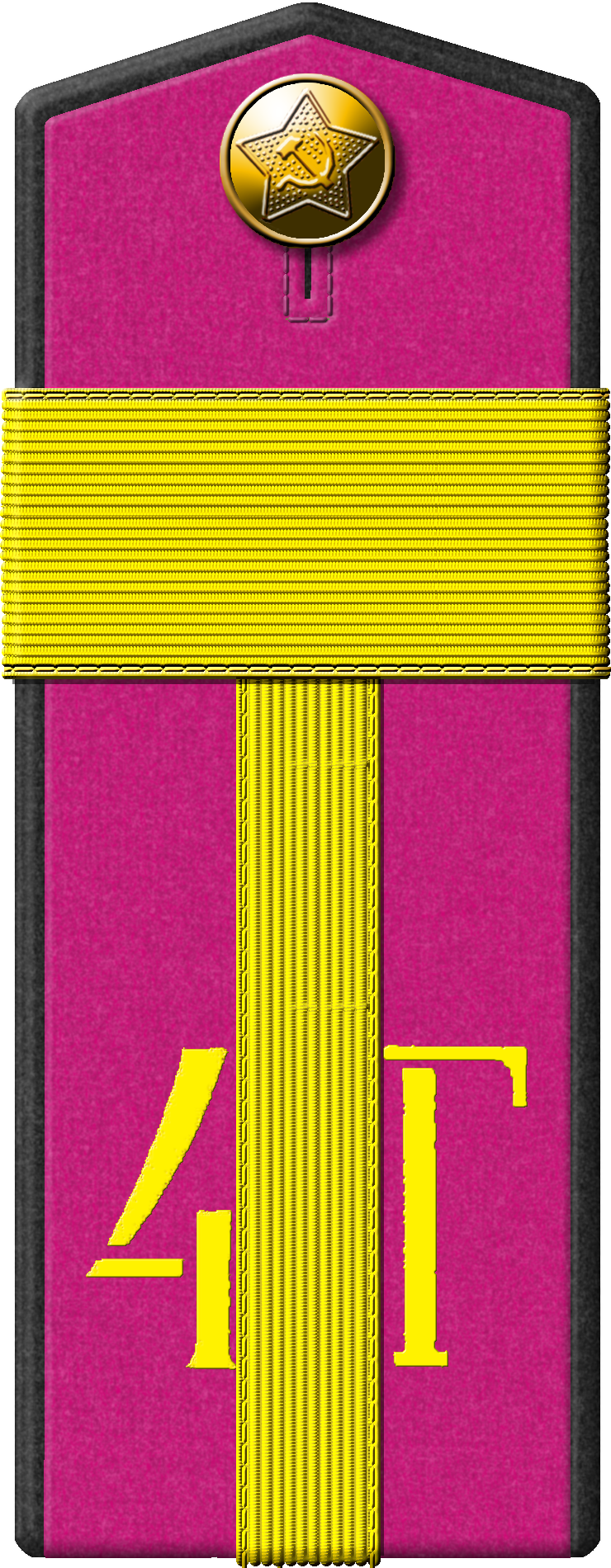
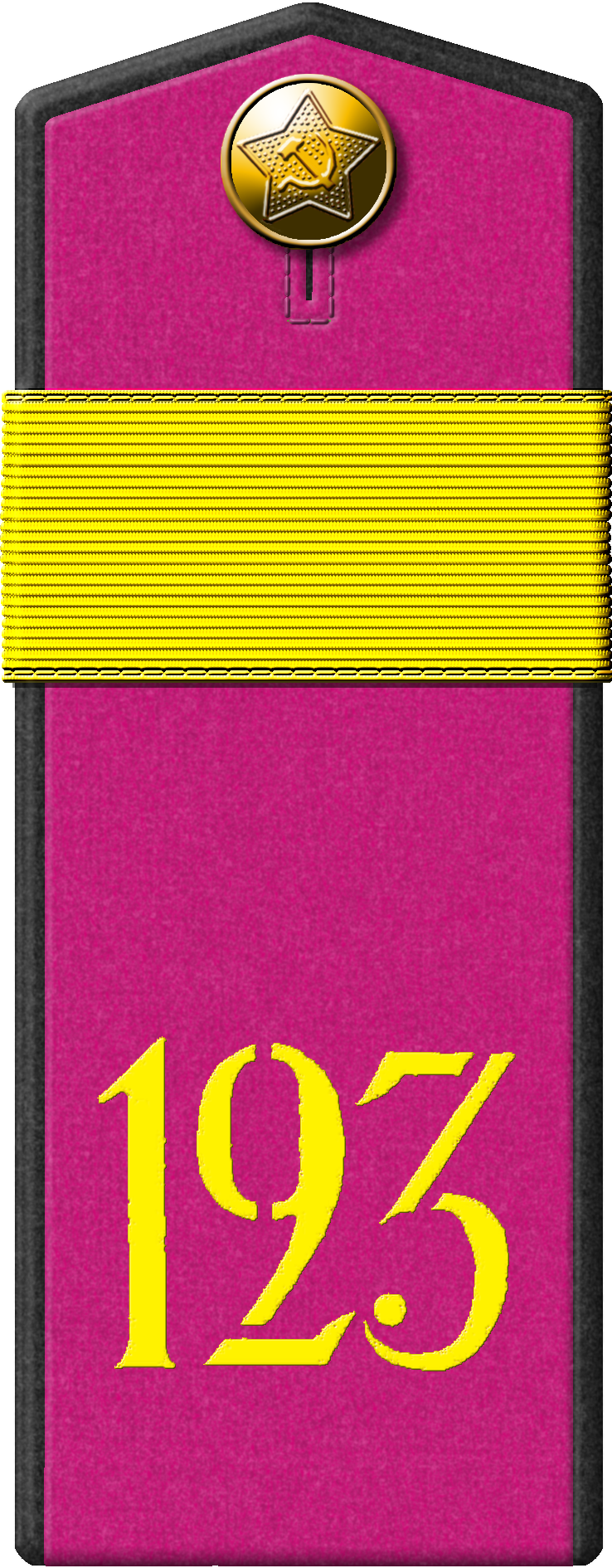
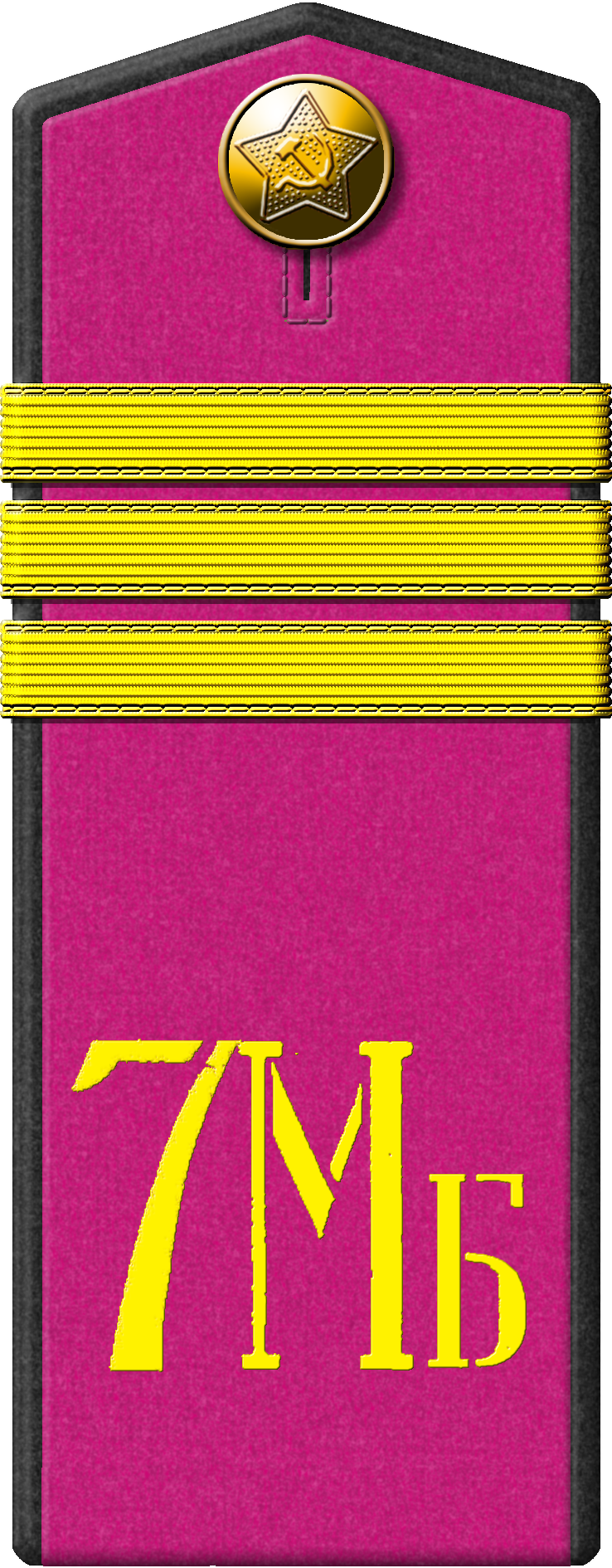
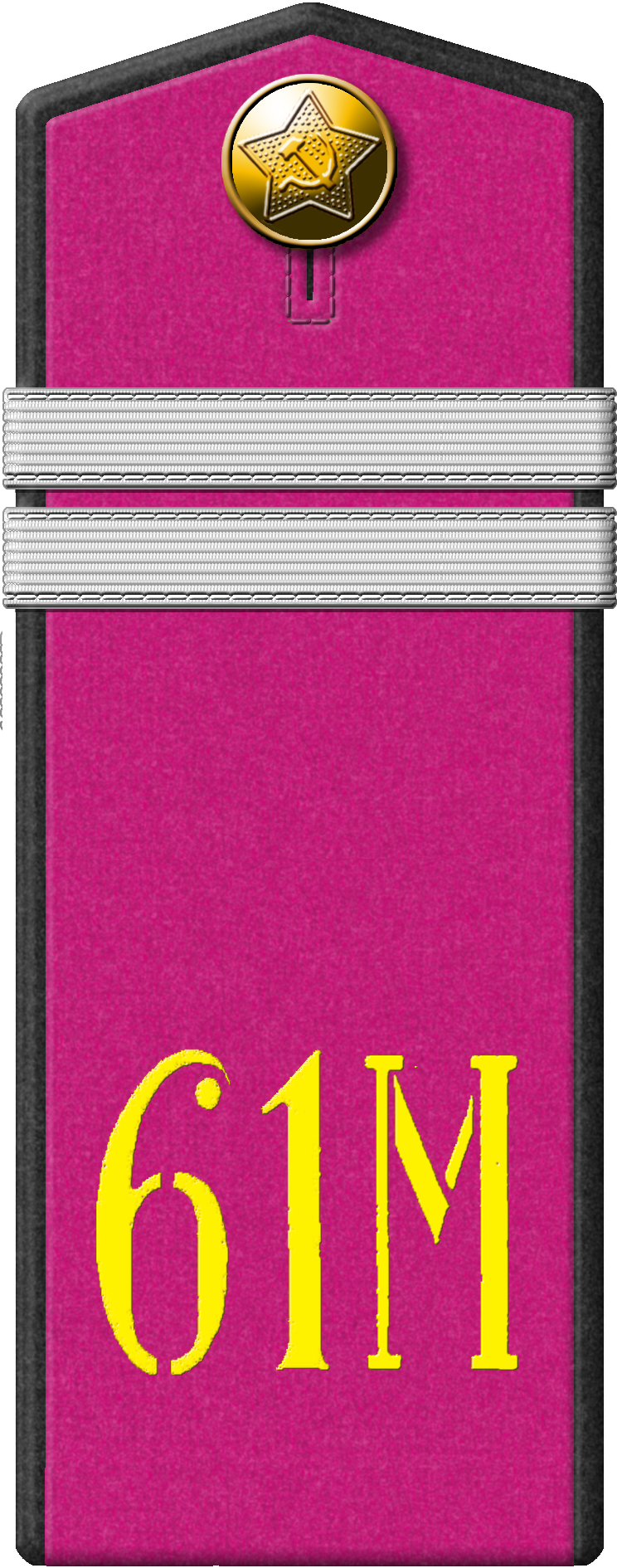
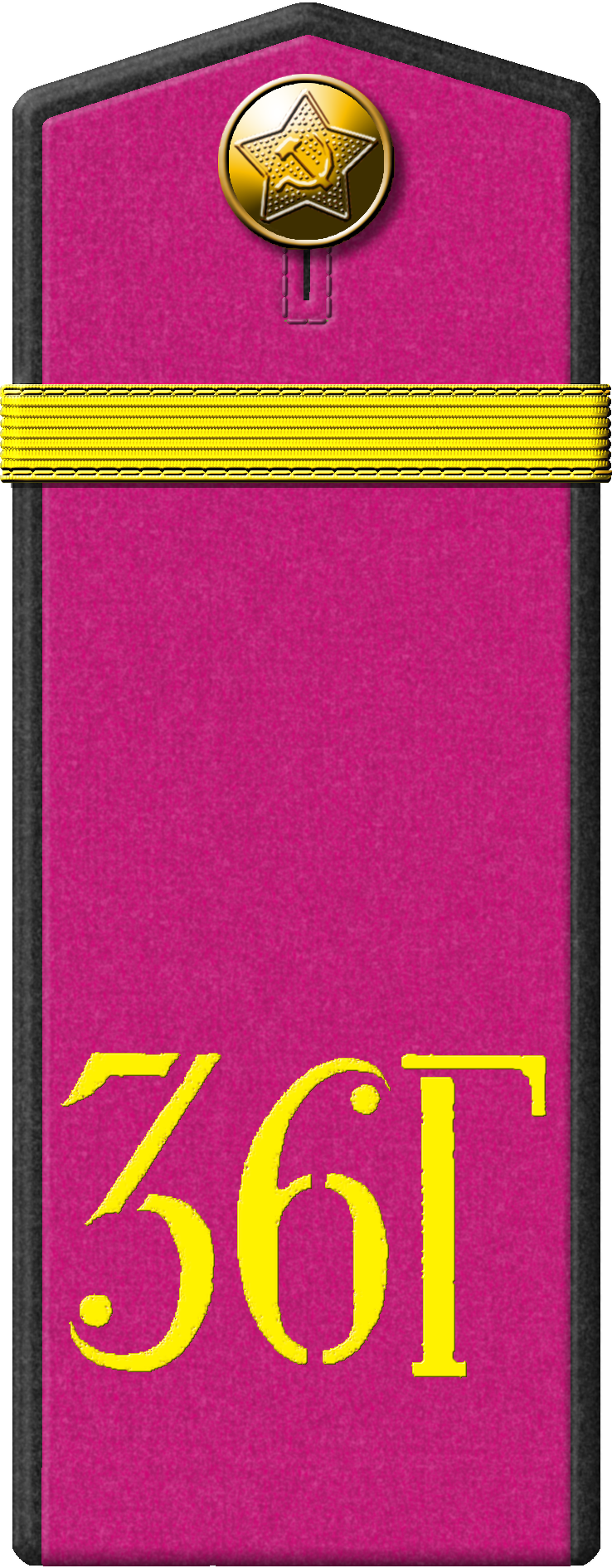
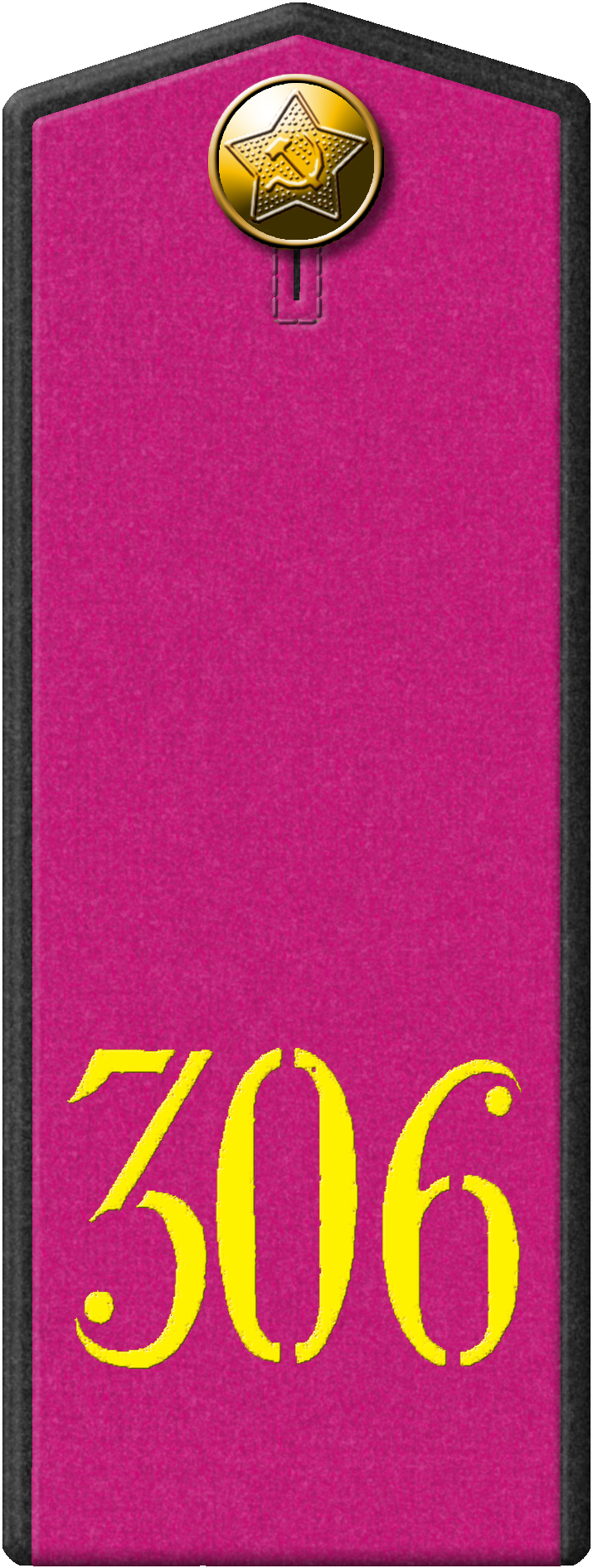
Rank group	Senior NCOs				Junior NCOs	Enlisted
Albanian People's Ground Forces
Albanian People's Ground Forces	Kapter i parë	Kapter	Rreshter i parë	Rreshter	Tetar	Ushtar
Albanian People's Air Force
Albanian People's Air Force	Kapter i parë	Kapter	Rreshter i parë	Rreshter	Tetar	Ushtar
Rank group	Senior NCOs				Junior NCOs	Enlisted

== See also ==
- Military ranks of the Albanian Kingdom
- Military ranks of Albania
