= Xhemal Aranitasi =

Commander in chief of the Royal Albanian Army (1886–1961)

Xhemal Araniti
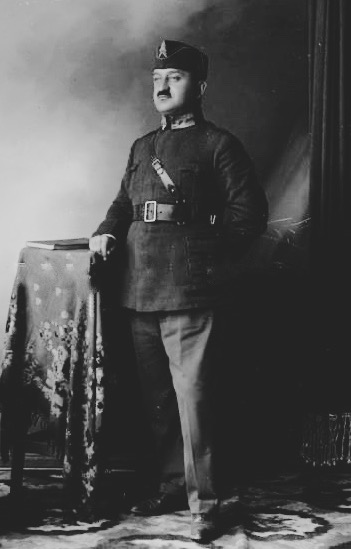
- Xhemal Aranitasi
- Born: 25 January 1886; Aranitas, Mallakastër District, Fier County, Ottoman Empire (present-day Albania)
- Died: 13 March 1961 (aged 75); Turkey
- Relatives: Ibrahim Aranitasi (Father), Esma Jahobegaj (Mother)
- Military career
- Allegiance: Royal Albanian Army
- Branch: Staff
- Service years: 19
- Rank: General
- Unit: Royal Albanian Staff
- Conflicts: First Balkan War; Battle of Shkodër; Second Balkan War; First World War; Vlora War; Italian invasion of Albania
- Awards: Order of Skanderbeg

Xhemal Aranitasi (also known as Xhemal Araniti; 25 January 1886 – 13 March 1961) was an Albanian general and commander in chief of the Royal Albanian Army.

He was the son of Ibrahim Aranitasi, an army colonel of the Ottoman Empire and Esma Jahobegaj. He graduated from the Monastir Military High School (now in present-day North Macedonia), and then at the military academy in Istanbul, Turkey.

During the Balkan wars, he fought in the Ottoman army as the leader of a machine gun unit.

During the First World War, when most of the territory of Albania was invaded by the Austro-Hungarian Army, he served in the Aranitas municipality as a commander of the gendarmerie.

In 1920, he joined the Royal Albanian Army, and four years later, he was a battalion commander. In 1925, with the rank of lieutenant colonel, he became the general commander of the Royal Albanian Army. Although significant decisions on the Army were taken by officers of foreign origins, such as Gustav von Myrdacz and Leon Ghilardi, Aranitasi was the only native Albanian nominally on the staff. In 1929 he was promoted to general. He served as aide-de-camp of Zog I of Albania before this task was taken by Mehmed Konica.

In 1939, as minister of war, in the face of war with Italy, Xhemal Aranitasi forbade the press publication of popular mobilization and prohibited issuing weapons to the civilian population. On April 6, 1939, on the eve of the invasion of Albania by the Royal Italian Army, Aranitasi left the country and settled in Turkey, where he lived until the end of his life.

He was awarded the Grand Ribbon of the Order of Skanderbeg.

== See also ==
- Royal Albanian Army
