= Royal Albanian Air Corps =

- Forcat Mbretërore të Aviacionit
- Active: 1928–1939
- Disbanded: 1939
- Country: (Albania) Albanian Kingdom (1928–1939)
- Allegiance: Royal Albanian Army
- Type: Air force
- Role: Aerial warfare
- Size: 5 Albatros C.XV two-seat trainer/reconnaissance aircraft
- Headquarter: Tirana
- Engagements: Italian Invasion of Albania

The Royal Albanian Air Corps (Albanian: Forcat Mbretërore të Aviacionit) existed from 1928 until 1939 and was a branch of the Royal Albanian Army. Of those European states that possessed an air corps in the years between the world wars, that of Albania was by far the smallest, numbering at most just five aircraft.

== History ==
Albania declared itself independent of Ottoman Turkey on 28 November 1912 in the aftermath of the First Balkan War, and the new state decreed the creation of a National Army six days later. The subsequent London peace conference appointed the German Prince William of Wied as head of state of the new Principality of Albania on 21 February 1914, following which the first efforts were made to add a small air unit to the National Army. Provision was made in the Constitution for an establishment of thirty-nine officers and men but, following the outbreak of the First World War, Prince Wilhelm of Albania fled the country, never to return, and the Principality of Albania collapsed.

For the following seven years Albania's territory was partitioned and occupied by the armies of its more powerful neighbours. It was not until December 1920 that the League of Nations recognized Albania's sovereignty as a 'Principality with a vacant throne', and accepted it as a member state. Following the country's re-emergence as an independent nation, a new National Army of some 15,600 men was decreed and several subsequent attempts were made to re-establish a small air arm.

However, the new country suffered acutely from both financial and political instability and, as short-lived governments came and went, insufficient money could be found to re-build the Air Corps; just five aircraft were acquired between 1922 and 1925. In December 1924, a Yugoslav army had invaded Albania, overthrowing the government, and re-installing Ahmed Bey Zogu as Prime Minister. Zogu quickly abolished the Principality and declared Albania a Republic with himself as President. He soon reneged on his promises to Yugoslavia, instead aligning the country with Italy, and in the years that followed, Mussolini's Italy took increasing control of Albania's financial, political and military affairs. In September 1928, Zogu secured the parliament's agreement to the dissolution of the Republic and declared Albania to be a monarchy with himself crowned Zog I, King of the Albanians; the National Army being re-styled Ushtria Mbretërore Shqiptare (Royal Albanian Army) and its tiny Air Corps was awarded the title of Forcat Mbretërore të Aviacionit (Royal Air Corps).

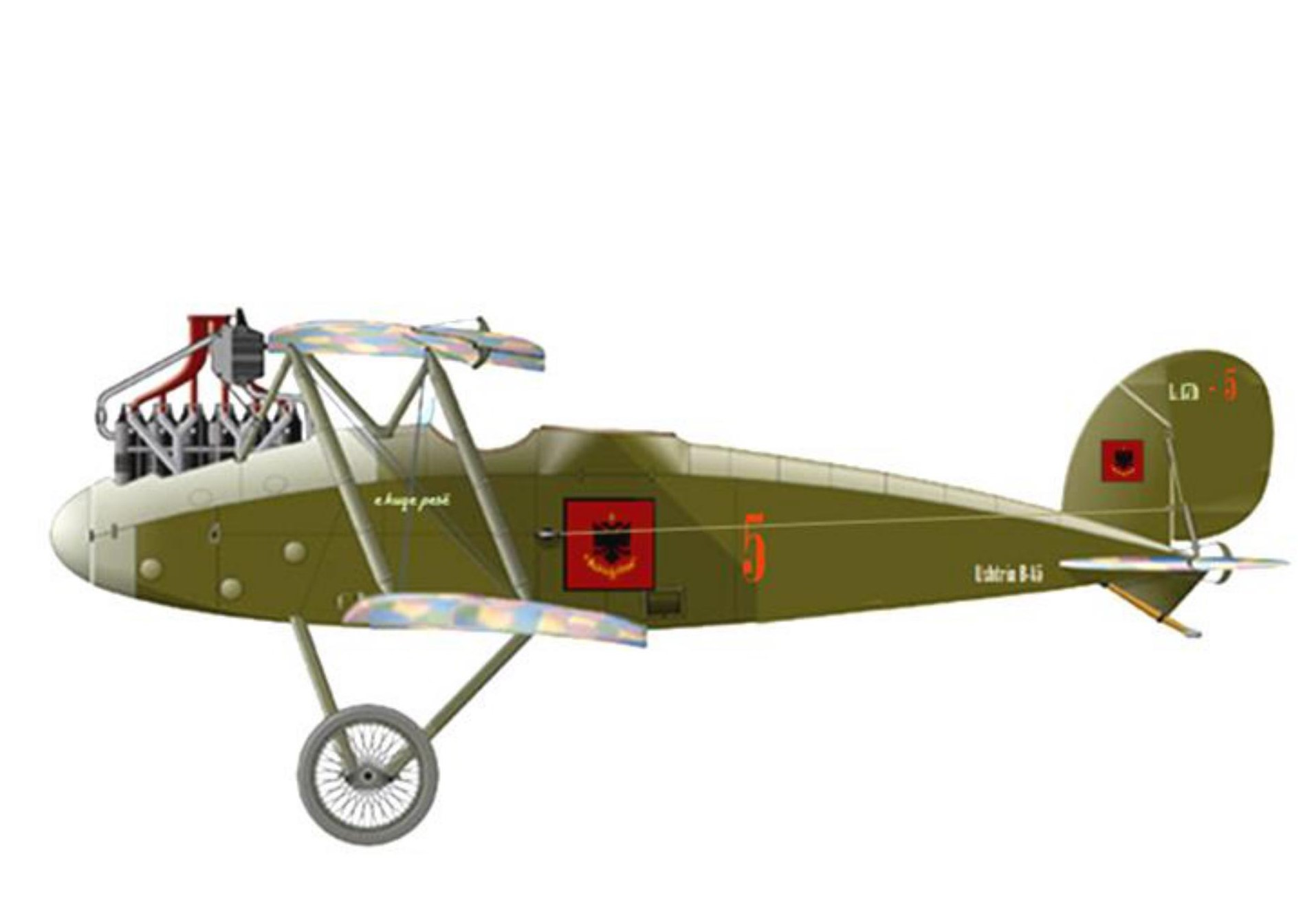
Albatros L.47b "Red 5", Forcat Mbretërore të Aviacionit, Royal Albanian Army, Tirana-Shijak, Albania, April 1939

However, although further attempts were made to enlarge the Royal Albanian Air Corps in 1931, 1934 and 1937, the country's almost total dependence on Italy prevented progress from being made, and although several Albanian pilots including a nephew of Zogu were sent to study at the Regia Aeronautica's training academy at Caserta, the Italians failed to supply any aircraft. Five Albatros C.XV/L.47s acquired between 1922 and 1925 remained the only known flying assets of the Forcat Mbretërore të Aviacionit until the force was disbanded following the Italian invasion of Albania on 7 April 1939. The British newspaper, The News Chronicle in their front-page report of 8 April 1939 detailing the invasion, stated that the country possessed no air force and that the army had just two aircraft in service. Time magazine's 17 April 1939 article on the Italian invasion confirmed this report, stating that Albania possessed just two military aircraft, assumed to be two surviving C.XV/L.47 reconnaissance/trainers and Bennighof states that the Air Corps numbered just fifteen men in 1939. There is no record of Albanian aircraft playing any part in the brief fighting that followed the invasion which, given the Italians' overwhelming air superiority, is not surprising. Albania was not to possess military aircraft again until the foundation of the Forca Ajrore e Republikës së Shqipërisë on 24 April 1951.

== Operations ==
The intention of the Royal Albanian Army had been to acquire a limited reconnaissance and army co-operation capability but, given the shortages of finance and facilities, it is unlikely that the FMA ever undertook much beyond training activities. There is no record of the engineering or support facilities needed to maintain World War I vintage aircraft in airworthy condition, and those facilities that existed were very rudimentary.

Italian airline Ala Littoria, which held a monopoly on commercial flights in Albania, operated from primitive airfields at Tirana-Laprakë, two kilometers west of the capital which served as Tirana airport, and at Debar near Peshkopi. However, these fields do not appear to have been used for military flying until they were later taken over by the Regia Aeronautica. Immediately following their April 1939 invasion, the Italians reported that the only existing military airstrips were:

Vlorë-Nartë (Valona), 1.5 kilometers north-west of Vlorë. The airstrip had been laid-out in the 1930s but the Italians considered it unsuitable for use by anything other than a handful of military aircraft.

Tirana-Shijak, 22 kilometers west of Tirana, is described by the Italians as a small marshy airfield with a rudimentary grass airstrip but with no infrastructure.

A later Regia Aeronautica report in October 1940 listed four further airfields at Korçë-North, Kuçovë, Drenovë and Shkodër (Scutari), all of which had been in use before the invasion.

== Equipment ==
Following the creation of the Principality of Albania in February 1914, an order was placed with Lohner-Werke GmbH of Vienna for three Lohner B.1 Series 11 reconnaissance/training biplanes together with three spare 90hp Austro-Daimler engines. However, the order was never fulfilled because, following the outbreak of the First World War, the Principality of Albania collapsed and its armed forces disintegrated.

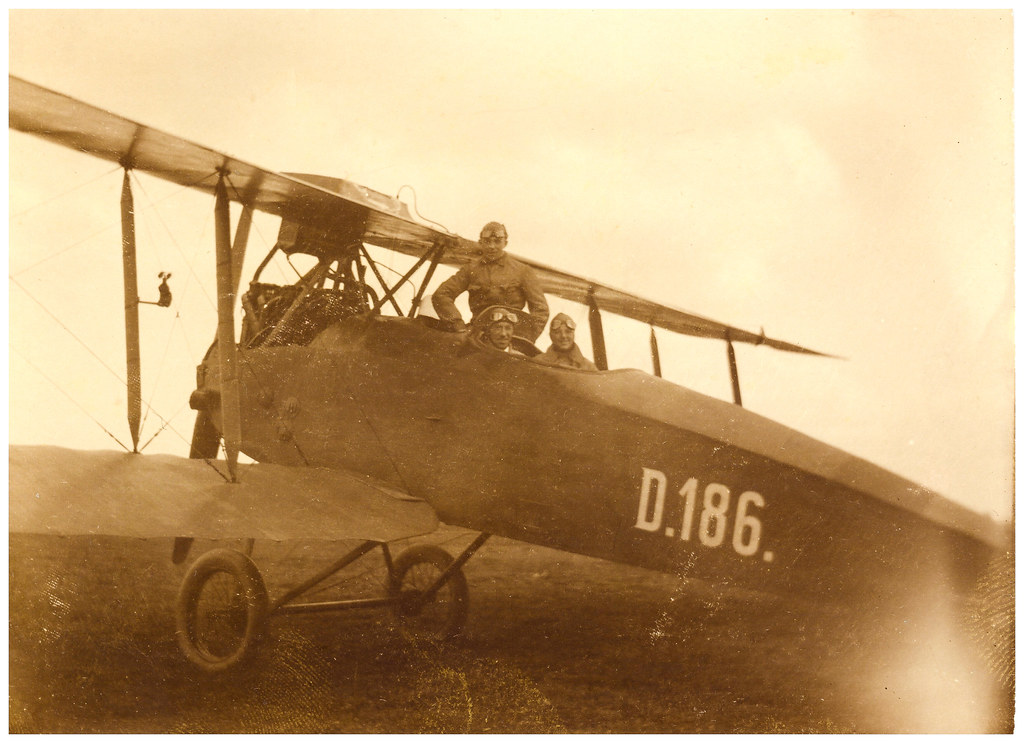
Albatros L.47 (de-militarized C.XV) photographed while on the German register as D-186 around 1920

During the brief existence of the Albanian Republic, an Albatros C.XV/L.47 aircraft is believed to have been delivered to Albania around 1922 and altogether five "Albatros-Fokker" aircraft were eventually delivered, ostensibly for use by the Albanian post office. The Paris Convention of 1919 had allocated International Civil Aviation Code BA to Albania in 1924 but no record exists of any registrations having been allocated and consequently the use of these machines as postal aircraft is improbable; it is more likely that they were acquired for military use. A German aircraft website lists five Albatros C.XV/L.47 aircraft that had appeared on the German register between 1919 and 1925 without mentioning their ownership or eventual destination, and if five C.XV/L.47s did end-up in Albania, it is likely that these were they.

List of types
| Aircraft | Origin | Type | Variant | In service | Notes |
|---|---|---|---|---|---|
| Lohner B.I | Austria-Hungary | Reconnaissance/trainer | Series 11 | None | 3 ordered 1914, none delivered |
| Albatros C.XV/L.47 | Germany | Reconnaissance/trainer | L.47 (4), L.47b (1) | 5 | Acquired 1922–1925, 2 remaining in 1939 |
