= Royal Border Guard (Albania) =

- Roja Mbretnore e Kufinit
- Active: 25 February 1929 – 7 April 1939
- Disbanded: 1939
- Country: Albania
- Allegiance: Royal Albanian Army
- Branch: Border Guard
- Type: Defence force
- Role: Protection of the Country
- Size: 91 officers, 222 NCOs and 1,500 soldiers
- Headquarters: Tirana
- Engagements: Italian Invasion of Albania

Commanders
- Commanding officer: Col. Ali Rizaja Topalli
- Second-in-command: Lt.Col. Enrico Palondrit

The Royal Border Guard (Albanian: Roja Mbretnore e Kufinit) was a border protection force of the Royal Albanian Army responsible for protecting Albania's territorial borders from smuggling activities and foreign interference.

== History ==
Shortly after the establishment of Albania's borders was officially recognised at the Ambassadors Conference in Paris on 30 July 1926, the need for a border protection force suddenly emerged. The Royal Border Guard was created on 25 February 1929. It was a military-financial organization which was tasked with stopping, suppressing and preventing smuggling and criminal activity along the country's newly formed borders. Its operations continued until 7 April 1939, the day Albania was invaded by Fascist Italian Forces.

== Structure ==
The force consisted of five battalions (commanders listed as of April 7, 1939):

- Border Battalion Korçë (Capt. Rexhep Radomira)
- Border Battalion Delvine (Capt. Haxhi Gilagoli)
- Border Battalion Durrës (Capt. Shaban Tirana)
- Border Battalion Shkodër (Cpt. Hamdi Jusufi)
- Instruction Battalion Korçë (Col. Preng Pervizi)

The Border Guard had a statutory strength of 91 officers, 222 NCOs and around 1,500 men, in 14 companies of 48 platoons subdivided into 119 squads, and probably had more or less that strength on the eve of the invasion. The Guard was more of a fiscal or customs police than a military arm, and was incorporated into the Italian Guardia di Finanza after the invasion.

== See also ==
- Border and Migration Police (Albania)
