= Royal Artillery of Albania =

Royal Albanian Artillery Forcat Mbretërore e Artilerisë
- Active: 1925–1939
- Disbanded: 1939
- Country: Albania
- Allegiance: Royal Albanian Army
- Branch: Artillery
- Size: 95 (officers)+ 26 (batteries)+ 64 (personnel)
- Headquarter: Tirana
- Engagements: Italian Invasion of Albania

Commanders
- Commander on April 7, 1939: Col. Sami Koka
- Commander on April 7, 1939: Maj. Ahmet Rrojte
- Commander on April 7, 1939: Lt.Col. Bombalti

The Royal Albanian Artillery (Albanian: Forcat Mbretërore e Artilerisë) was from 1928 till 1939 and was part of the Royal Albanian Army.

== Structure ==
In 1939 the army had eight of nine planned batteries (x2) of 65mm L/17 mountain guns (3 days ammunition), four batteries mountain guns (2x of Škoda 75mm L/13) (3 days ammunition), and two batteries of field guns (4x Krupp Model 1906 75mm L/27) (one horse-drawn, one nominally motorized)(1 day's ammunition) (Note that in Italian practice, a day's ammunition for light artillery was 250 rounds)

There may have still existed in 1939 a "school battery" of unknown composition There was also one battery of mountain guns (4x Škoda 75mm L/13)(horse-drawn) with the Gendarmerie and another (also 4x Škoda 75mm L/13 mountain guns) with the Royal Guard. At Durrës there was in 1939 a coastal battery ("Prandaj", Cpt. Gjergj Mosko) of four Krupp Model 1906 75mm L/27, covering the port, in casements presumably built by Italian engineers. Also at Durrës were two Turkish-era forts which had in 1912/1913 three light guns each, of unknown status in 1939. Possibly under the artillery arm was the "Artilërisë Kunder Ajrorë" (AA Artillery) established in 1931 (in 1939, commanded by Major Rauf Fratari). This comprised "small caliber" batteries at Durrës, Shëngjinit and Sarandë. The army possessed 18 Schwarzelose MG (1 day's ammunition) ceded by the Italians, and since these ex-Austrian weapons existed in an AA mount (of which the Italians had acquired several hundred), possibly each battery comprised 6 of these. Sources mention a formation called the "Grupi i Artilërisë Divisionalë" (Maj. Ahmet Rrojte ?). If this was the designation for the field/mountain artillery under army command, it comprised

- One group mountain artillery
- 3 batteries with mountain guns (2x Škoda 75mm L/13)(pack)
- One group field artillery
- 1 battery with field guns (4x Krupp 75mm L/27)(horse drawn)
- 1 battery with field guns (4x Krupp 75mm L/27)(motorized)

The number of all batteries that were with the army were:

- 12 batteries of 65 mm Italian (3 days ammunition)
- 6 batteries of 75 mm Škoda (3 days ammunition)
- 2 batteries of 105 mm Italian
- 2 batteries of 149 mm Italian (8 guns)
- 1 coastal artillery battery of four Krupp Model 1906 75mm L/27 in Durrës
- 3 AA artillery batteries
