= Charles Telford Erickson =

American theologian

- Born: July 15, 1867; Galesburg, Illinois
- Died: 1966 (aged 98–99); California
- Occupations: Pastor, School principal
- Years active: 1897-1966
- Known for: Founder of Albania's first Farming school
- Notable work: Charles Telford Erickson papers
- Awards: Order of Skanderbeg, 1931

Charles Telford Erickson, b. 1867 Galesburg, Illinois, d. 1966 California, was an American pastor and theologian who also worked in Albania, where he founded the first vocational school for farmers.

== Life and career ==
Ericksons parents were from Sweden. He made a B.A. in 1891 and an M.A. in 1893 at DePauw University and, in 1895, an S.T.B. at Boston University. He began to work as a pastor in Rangoon, Burma in 1897, but he had to return to America because of illness of his wife. He then served as pastor in Ohio, then went to complete his studies at Yale University where he received a Master's degree in 1902. After his studies he first worked as pastor of a congregation in Hartford, Connecticut. In 1908 he became director of the American Board of Commissioners for Foreign Missions at Elbasan, then a part of the Ottoman Empire. He stayed 12 years in office and then worked another 14 years independently in the now independent state of Albania. 1914 he got a D.D. from the Drury University. During the First World War, he worked as official of the Red Cross in Italy. After the war, he was chosen an honorary delegate to the Paris Peace Conference by Vatra, the Pan-Albanian Federation of America and the provisional government of Albania. He acted as a special commissioner for Albania to the United States in 1920-1921 and, from 1922 to 1923, he assisted the diplomatic staff at the American Embassy in Tirana. He proposed to Fan Noli and Ahmet Zogu the establishment of vocational schools for boys and girls, especially for farming. Herbert Hoover donated $10.000 for the building of the schools. In 1925, the schools were opened under the name "Albanian-American Schools of Agriculture" in Golem, Kavajë. Erickson worked there as school principal until 1937. In 1930 the Near East Foundation took over responsibility for the administration. In 1939, when Italy occupied Albania, it relinquished the property of the schools. After the communist takeover in 1945, the schools continued to exist under the name Ylli i kuq (i.e. „Red Star“), in 2012 the whole school was named after its founder Shkolla e mesme profesionale Charles Telford Erickson (Professional secondary school Charles Telford Erickson).

Ericksons first wife was Carrie Louise Earl, whom he married in 1895. They got five children. After she died (date is unknown), he married Alice Lee Welcher in 1936. He retired in 1937 but served as a delegate of Vatra to the United Nations Conference on International Organization at San Francisco in 1945. He also served as interim pastor to congregations at Portsmouth, New Hampshire; Nantucket Island, Massachusetts; Lake Helen, Florida; and Avalon, California; and made trips to Australia and New Zealand to promote the World Council of Churches. After having lived at Capri, Corfu, Rhodes, Guernsey, Jersey and Britain, he and his wife finally settled in California where he died in 1966 in the age of 99.

== Work ==
- Albania, The Key to the Muslim World, The Muslim World, v4n2 (1914) 115.
- Shqiptarët-enigma e Ballkanit Charles Telford Erickson; translation: Mal Berisha; red.: Tomor Plangarica; entry at the National Library of Albania
- Cutting the Gorgon Knot, C. Telford Erickson
- Charles Telford Erickson papers, C. Telford Erickson, entry at Yale Archives

== Literature ==
- Stone pillows : an American Christian missionary in the Moslem land of King Zog : an historic biography of C. Telford Erickson, educator and diplomat in Albania, 1908-1939 by Phyllis Braunlich
- Fusonie, Alan E. "The Albanian-American School of Agriculture: Erickson and Hoover. Its Forgotten Benefactors 1920-1939" Chapter IV revised, of Charles Telford Erickson: American Friend of Albania, Ph.D. dissertation, Catholic University of America, 1970. Box 1, Folder 2.
- New East Foundation, A Key to the Balkans. New York: 1923, 12 pp. Box 7, Folder 6
- Who's Who in America, 26th ea., s.v. "Erickson, Charles Telford"
- Instituti Shqiptaro Amerikan i Kavajës dhe Charles Telford Ericksoni by Iljaz Gogaj( Book )
- Jeta e jashtëzakonshme e amerikanit Charles Telford Erickson kushtuar Shqipërisë: biography by Mal Berisha
