= Order of Skanderbeg (1925–1945) =

Order of merit of the Albanian Republic

Order of Skanderbeg Urdhëri i Skënderbeut
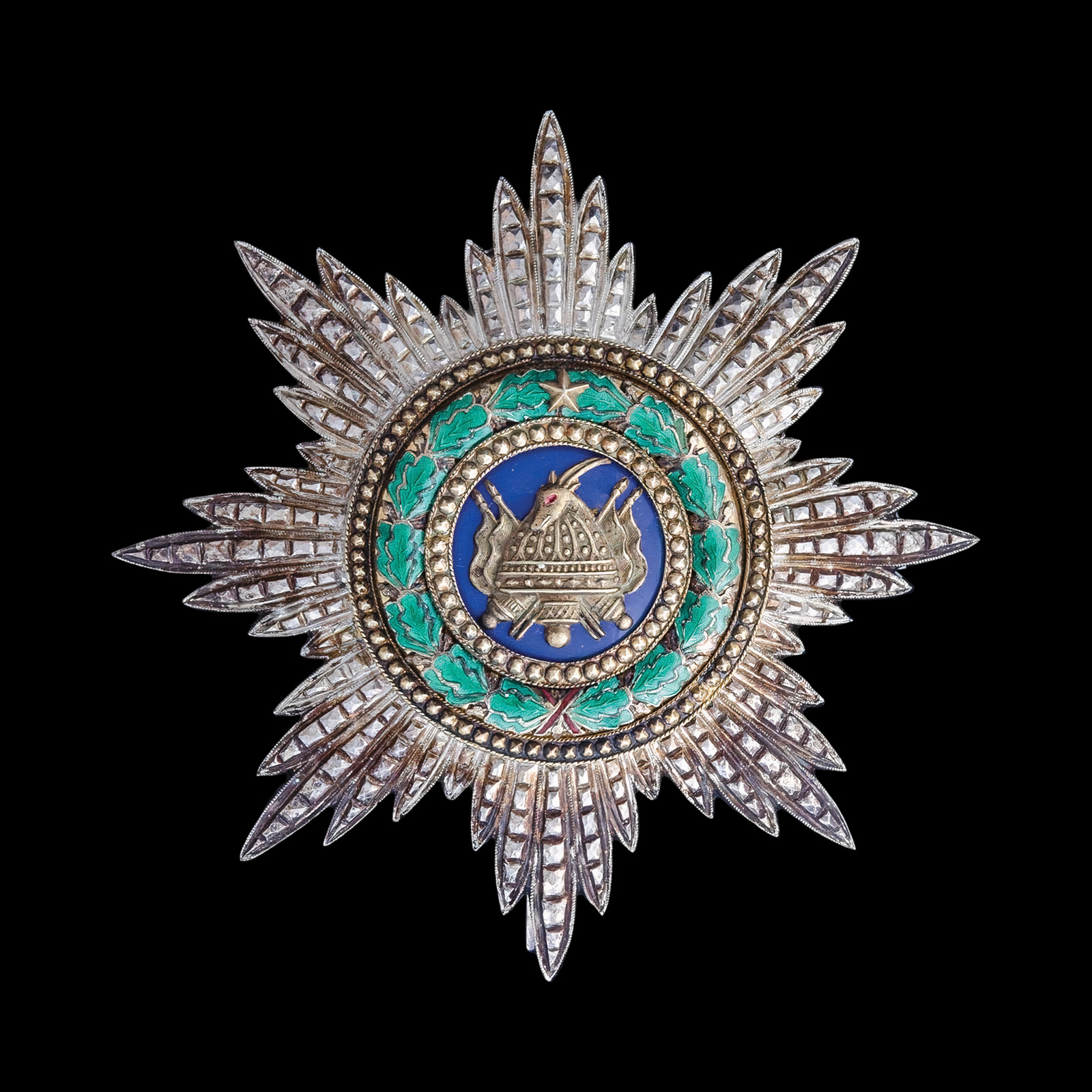
- Grand Officer of the Royal Albanian Order c.1930

Awarded by Head of the House of Zogu
- Type: Order of merit
- Established: 3 December 1925
- Country: Albania
- Royal house: House of Zogu
- Criteria: Distinguished services rendered to the Crown and achievements in every field of society
- Sovereign: Crown Prince Leka of Albania
- Classes: Grand Cordon with Star; Grand Officer; Commander; Officer; Knight

Precedence
- Next (higher): Order of Fidelity
- Next (lower): Order of Bravery
- Ribbon bar

The Order of Skanderbeg (Albanian: Urdhëri i Skënderbeut) was originally instituted in 1925 as an order of merit of the Albanian Republic. It was replaced by the Communist government in 1945 with a new award of the same name. Skanderbeg is the national hero of the Albanian people.

The Albanian royal family currently maintains the Order of Skanderbeg as a dynastic order, which has only been awarded to a select number of people since the fall of the monarchy in 1939. This order should not be mistaken for the award of the same name which is currently given by the head of the Republic of Albania.

== History ==
The president and later king of Albania, Ahmet Zogu, founded the order in 1925 as an order of merit with four grades. After the Italian annexation of Albania, his successor, Victor Emanuel III, King of Italy and of Albania, Emperor of Ethiopia, added a fifth grade (Officer) in 1940.

In 1945, the People's Republic of Albania decided to replace the order. In that same year, a new order with the same name was founded, along the lines of the Socialist Orders of Merit. It was awarded until the fall of Albanian Communism in 1990.

The Communist version of the order was created on 13 October 1945 with three classes. The medal design included an image of Skanderbeg on a five pointed star, and the ribbons were red with 1 to 3 blue stripes according to the class of award. It was awarded to officers of the Albanian People's Army and the Ministry of Internal Affairs as a recognition of services to the country and the people for the organisation, modernisation and reinforcement of the armed forces.

Another honorary award bearing Skanderbeg's name, also known as the Order of Skanderbeg, has been instituted by the current Republic of Albania.

== Notable recipients ==
- Julian Amery (Grand Cordon)
- General Xhemal Aranitasi, former commander in chief of the Royal Albanian Army
- Muharrem Bajraktari (Grand Cordon)
- Herman Bernstein 1933
- Mieczysław Cygan (Commander)
- Lt Col Edward Cuthbert de Renzy-Martin, CMG, DSO, MC
- Charles Telford Erickson, 1931
- Dimitrije, Serbian Patriarch
- Captain Fiqiri Dine (Officer)
- Rauf Fico (Officer)
- Mehdi Frashëri (Grand Cordon)
- Kostaq Kotta (Grand Cordon)
- Abaz Kupi (Grand Cordon)
- Leka, Crown Prince of Albania (Crown Star)
- Ekrem Libohova (Grand Cordon)
- Gustav von Myrdacz (Grand Cordon)
- Prenk Pervizi (Officer)
- Roger Peyrefitte (Knight), 1939 last decoration awarded by King Zog
- Alfred Rappaport von Arbengau (Grand Cordon)
- David Smiley (Grand Cordon)
- Cafo Beg Ulqini (Knight)
- Victor Emmanuel III of Italy
- Iliaz Vrioni (Grand Cordon)

For subsequent awards, see Order of Skanderbeg (1990–).

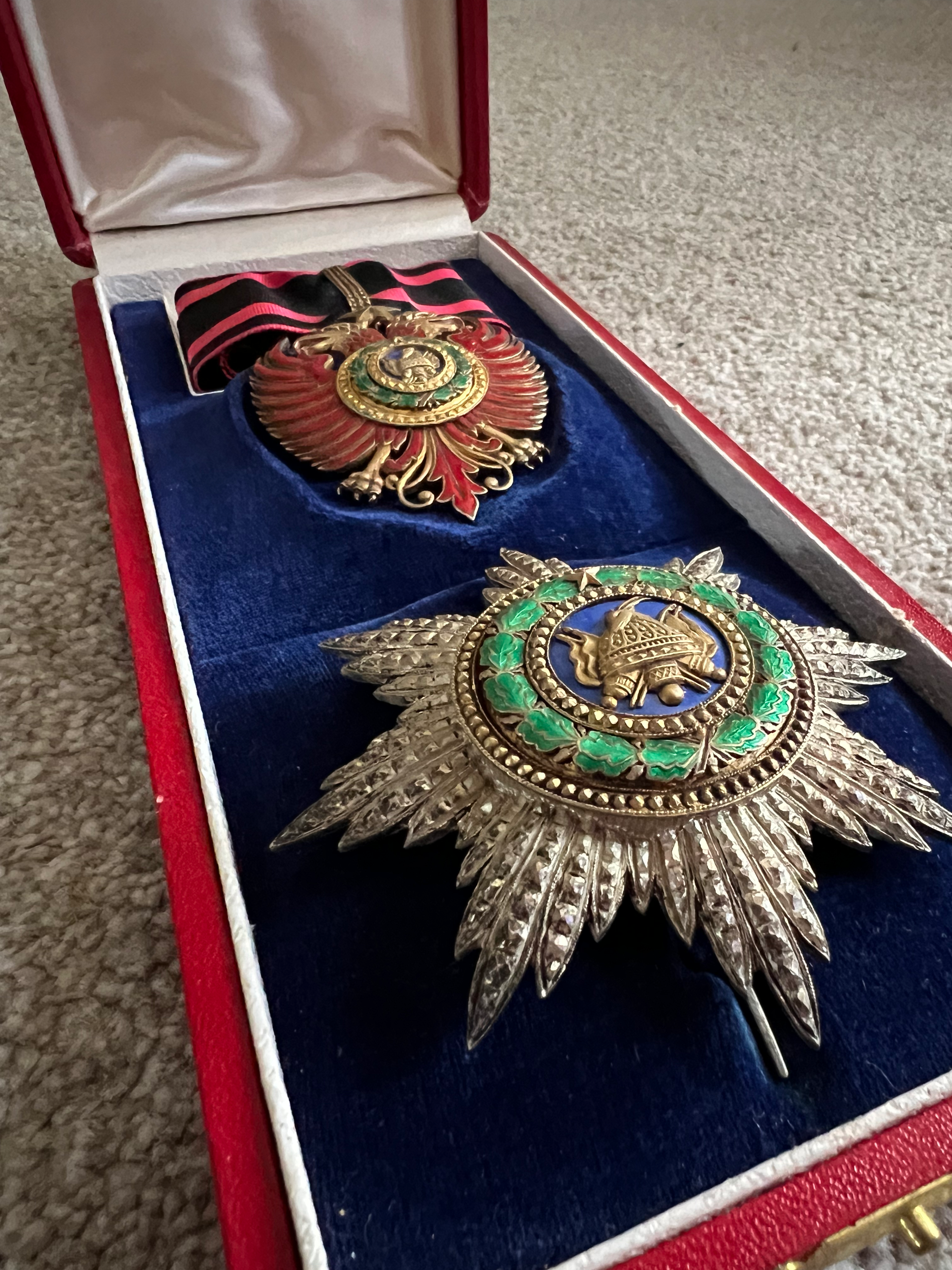
Grand Officer star c.1930.

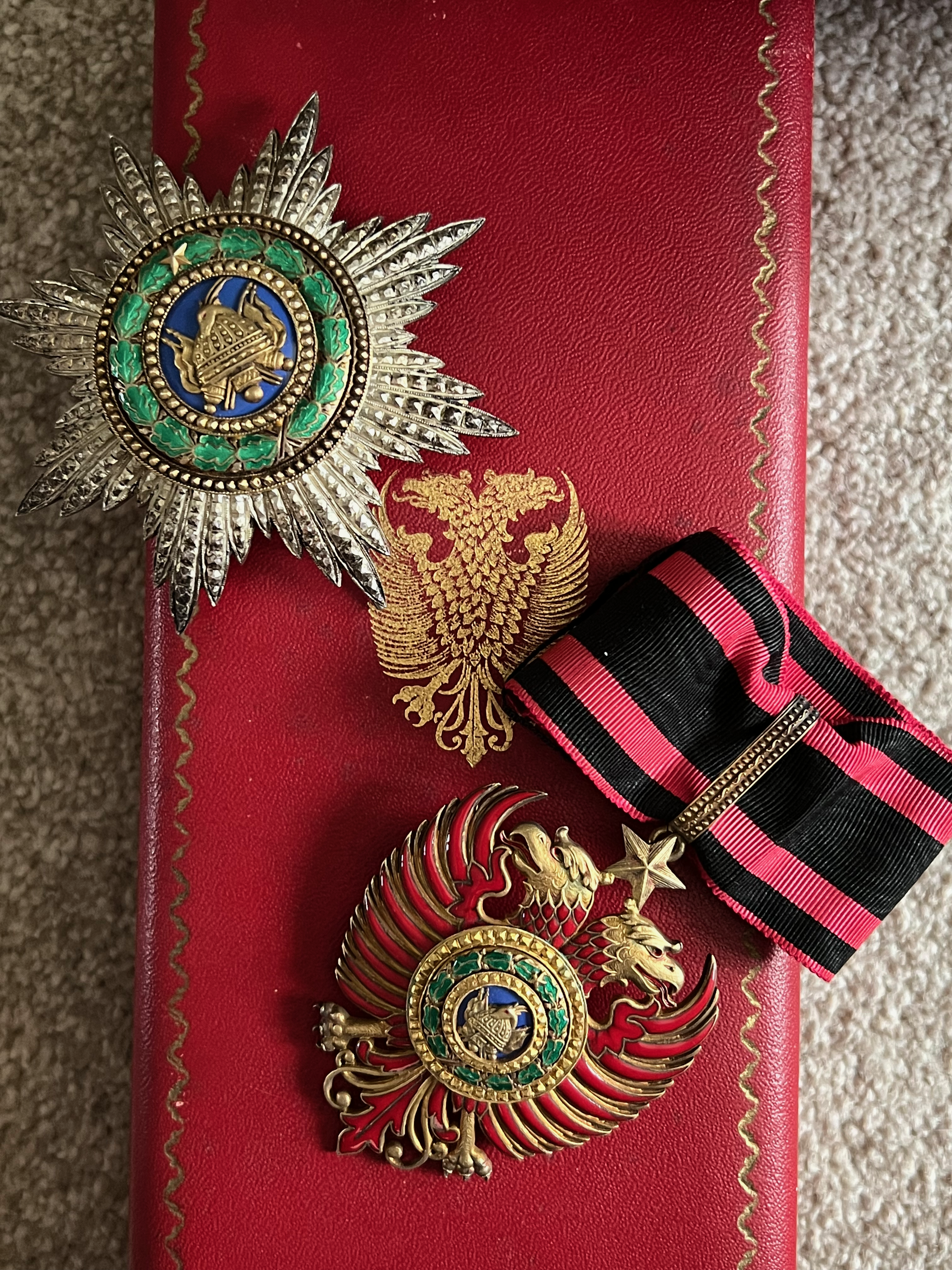
Grand Officer set c.1930.

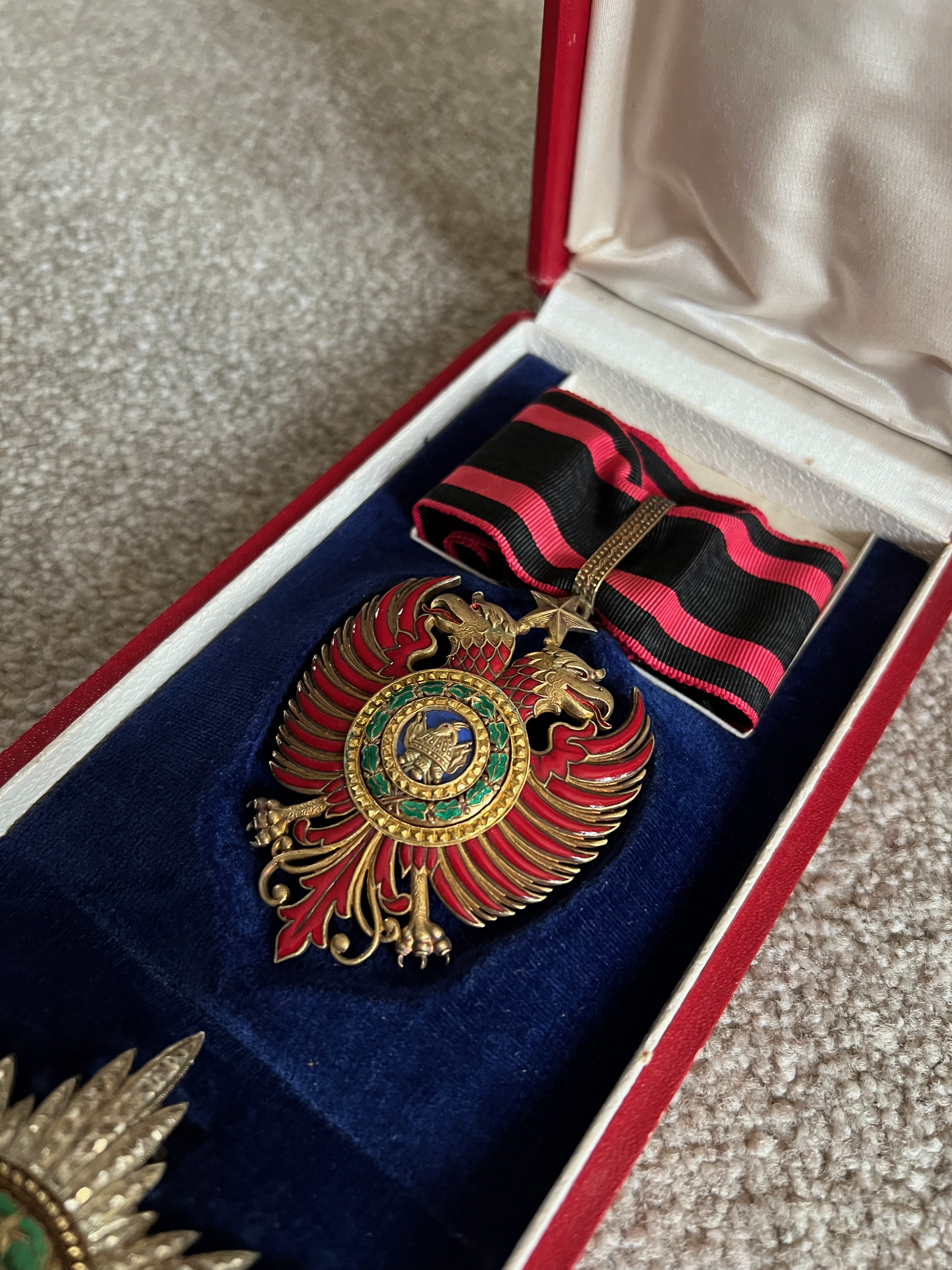
Badge of a Grand Officer set c.1930.

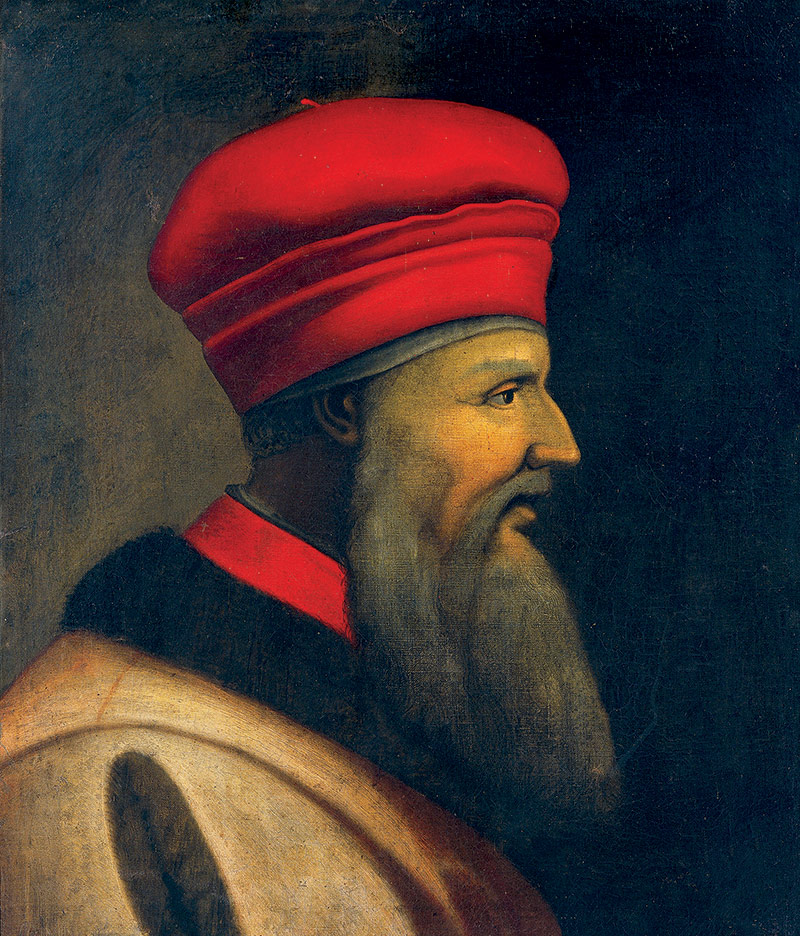
The namesake of the order; Skanderbeg.

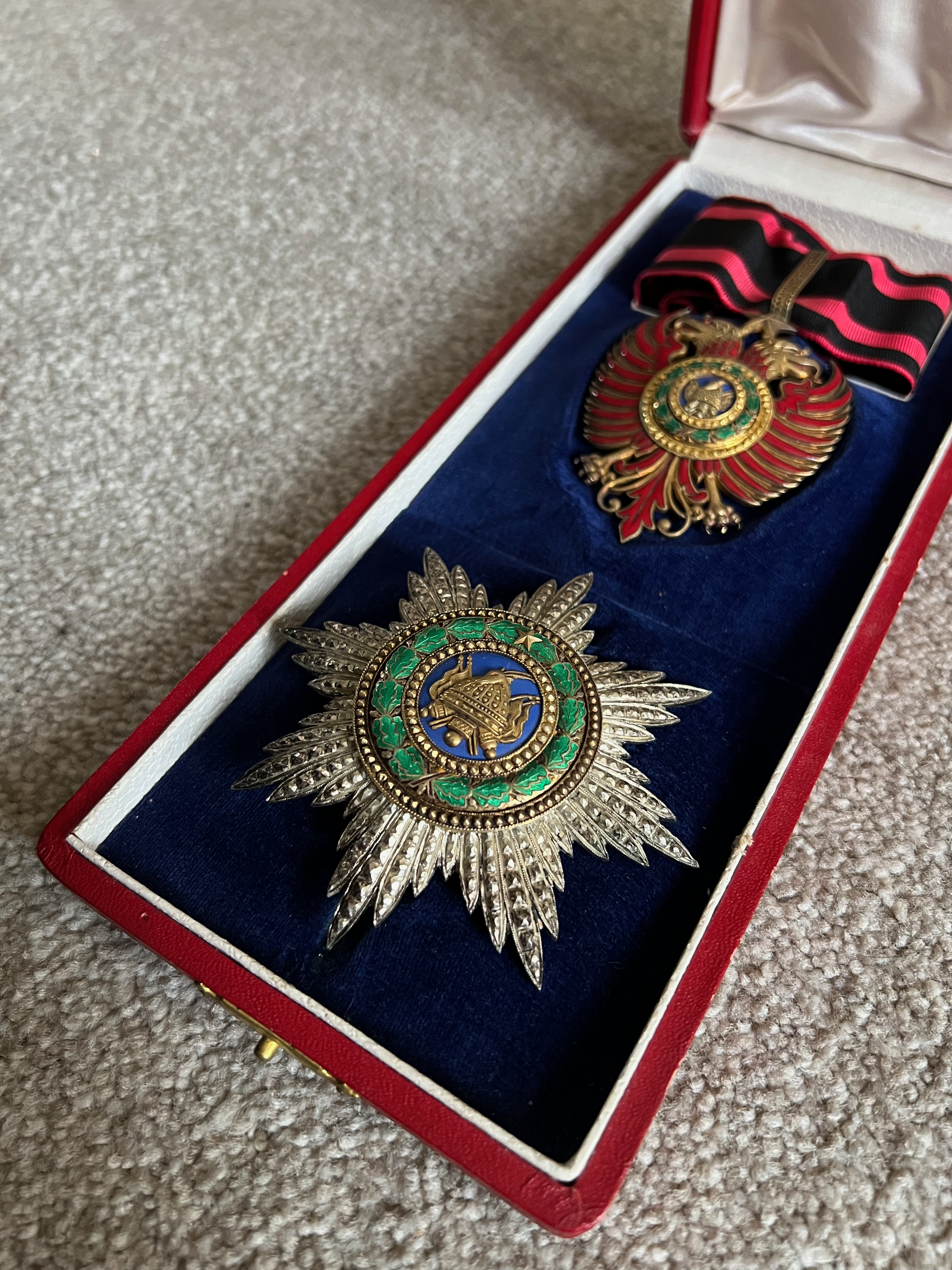
Grand Officer set.

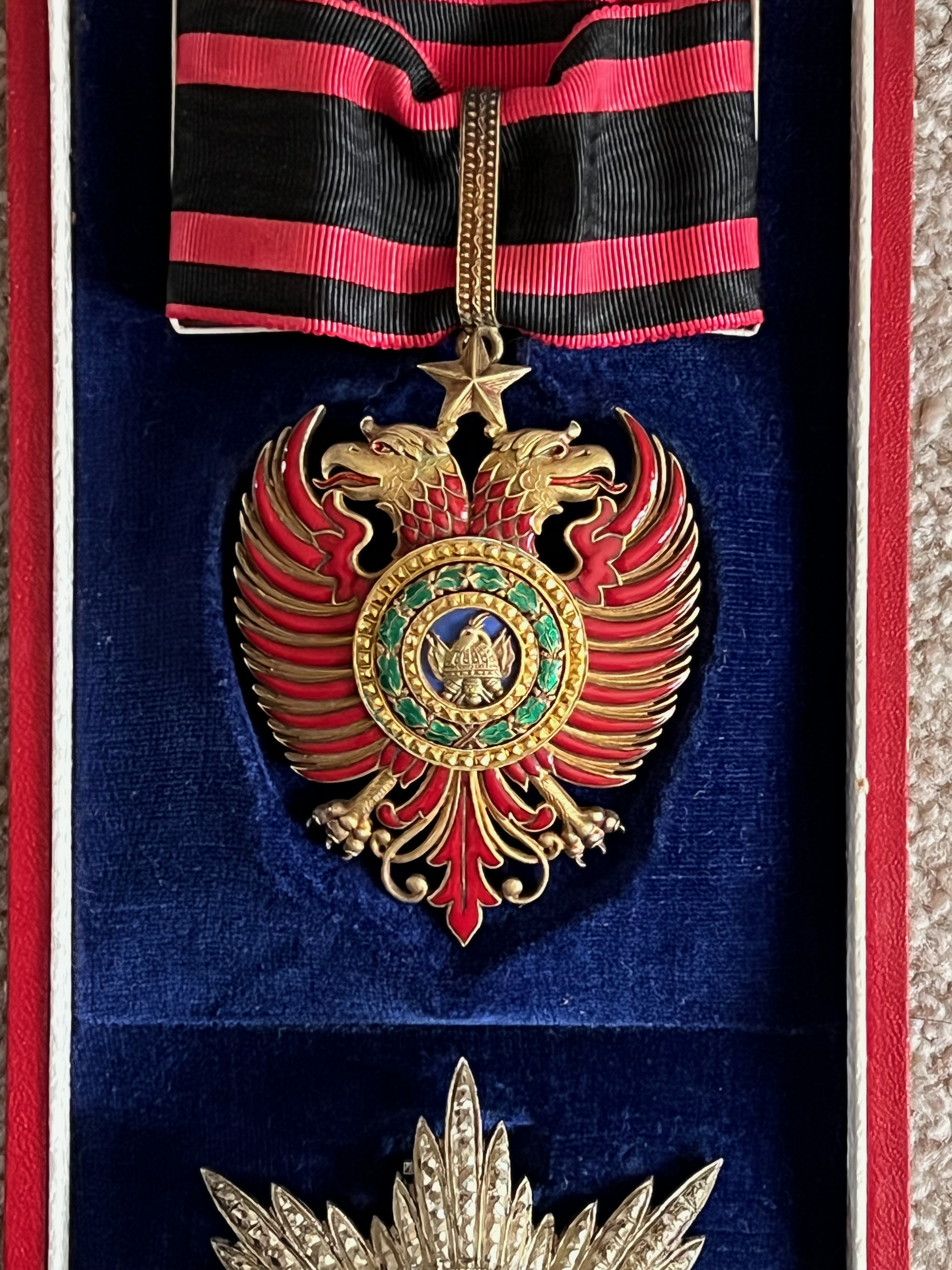
Close-up of the badge and neck ribbon of a Grand Officer.

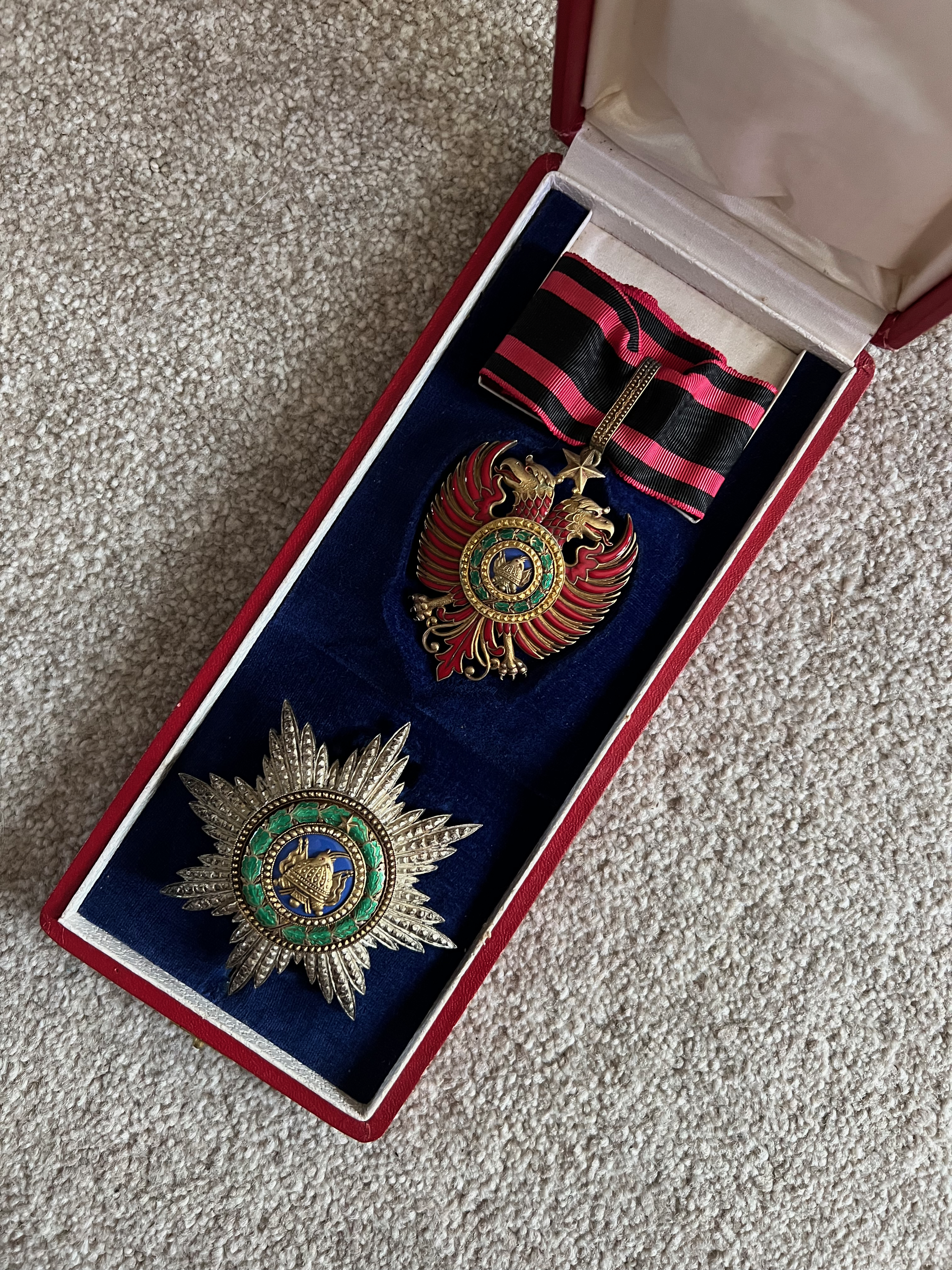
1930s Grand Officer set.

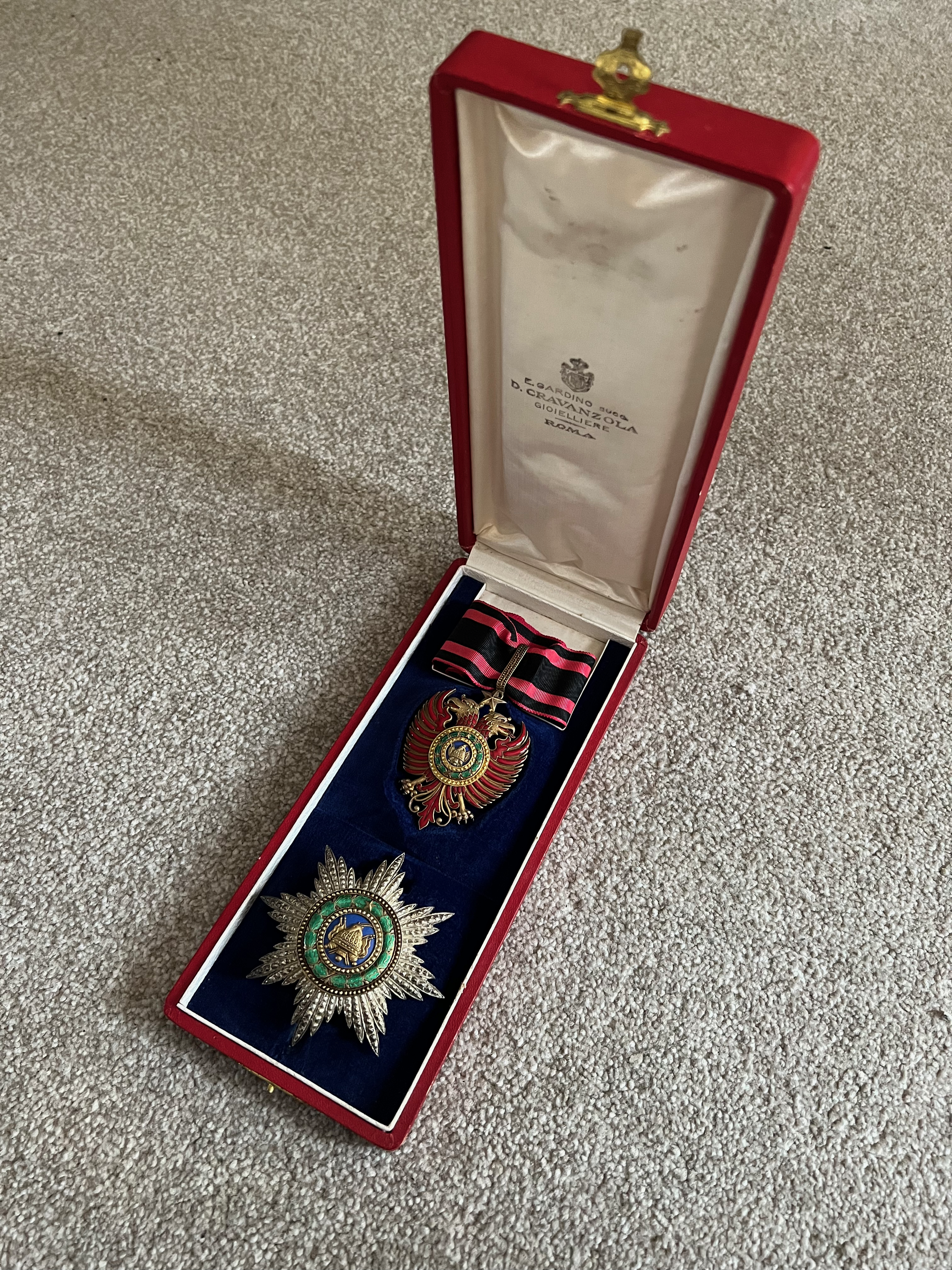
Set of the Grand Officer in a case by Cravanzola of Rome.

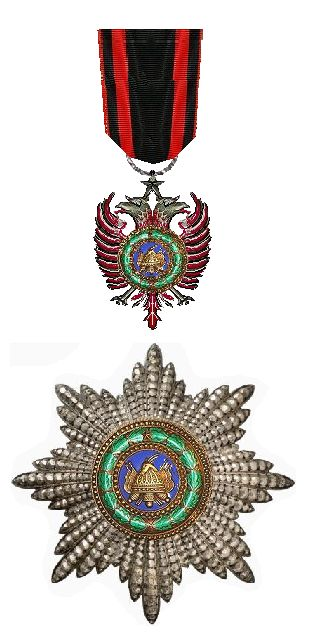
Knights class with a Grand Cross star.

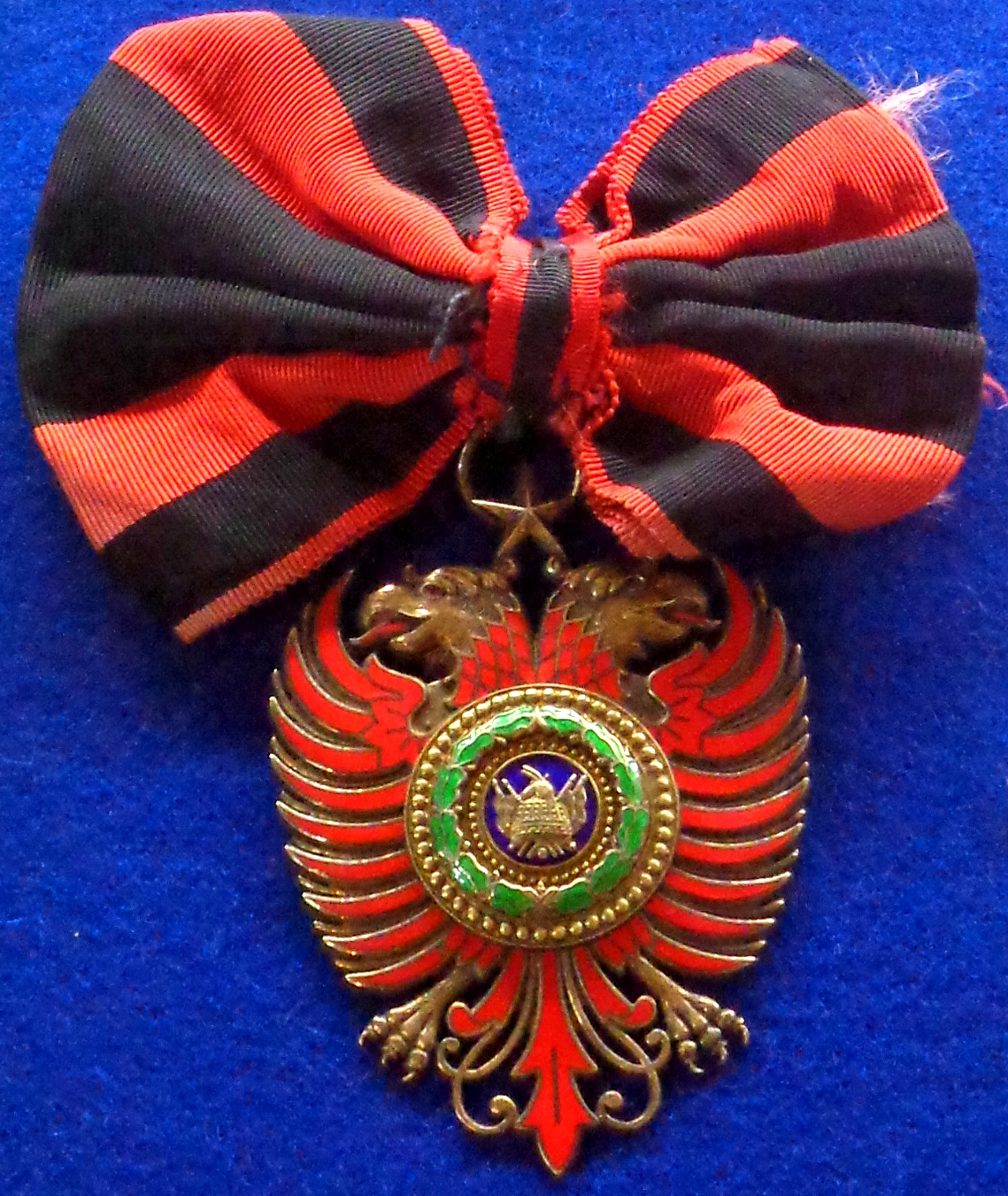
Commanders class of the order on a ladies bow.

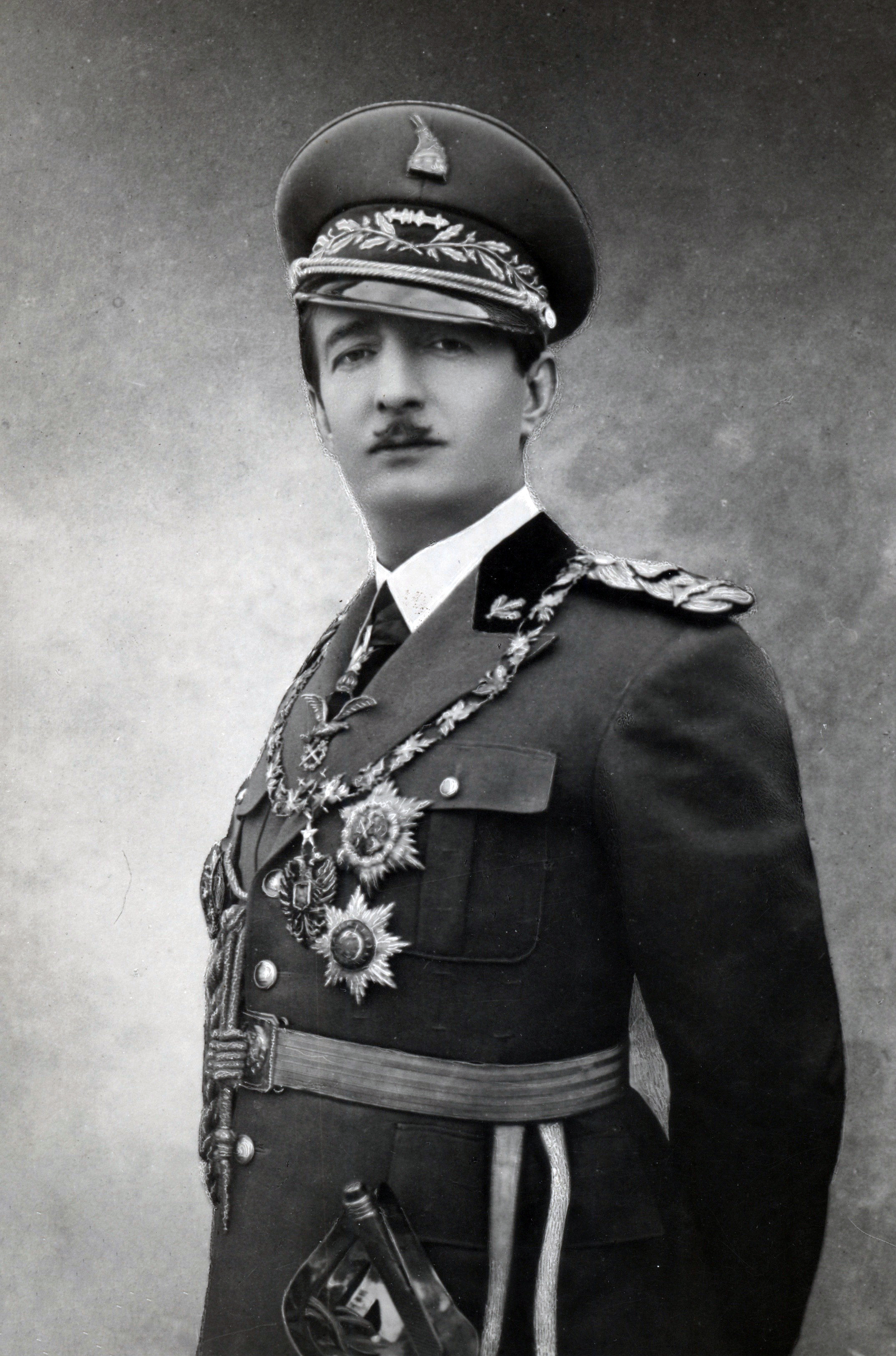
King Zog I of Albania, the orders founder, wearing the star of the Grand Cross.

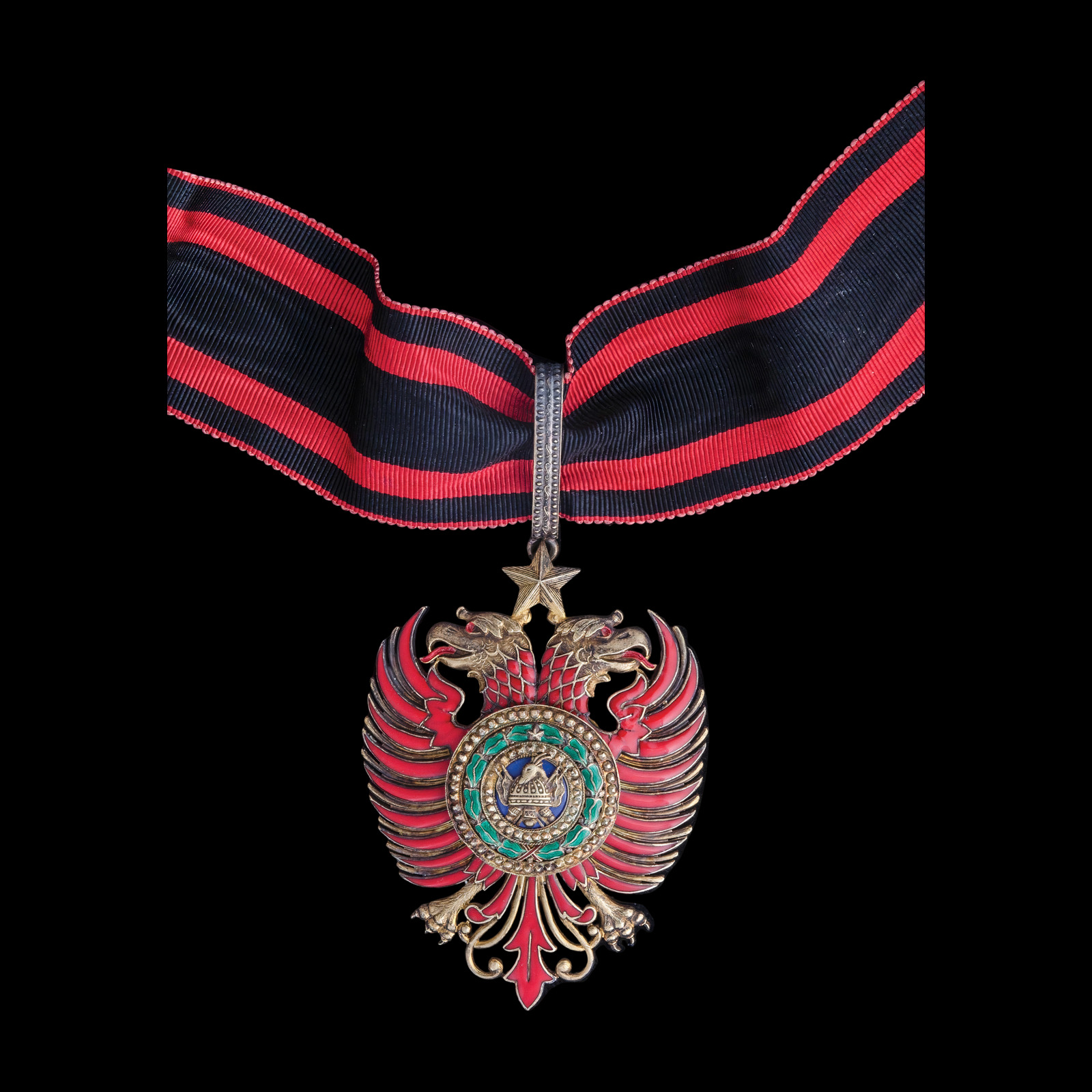
Commanders Class of the order.

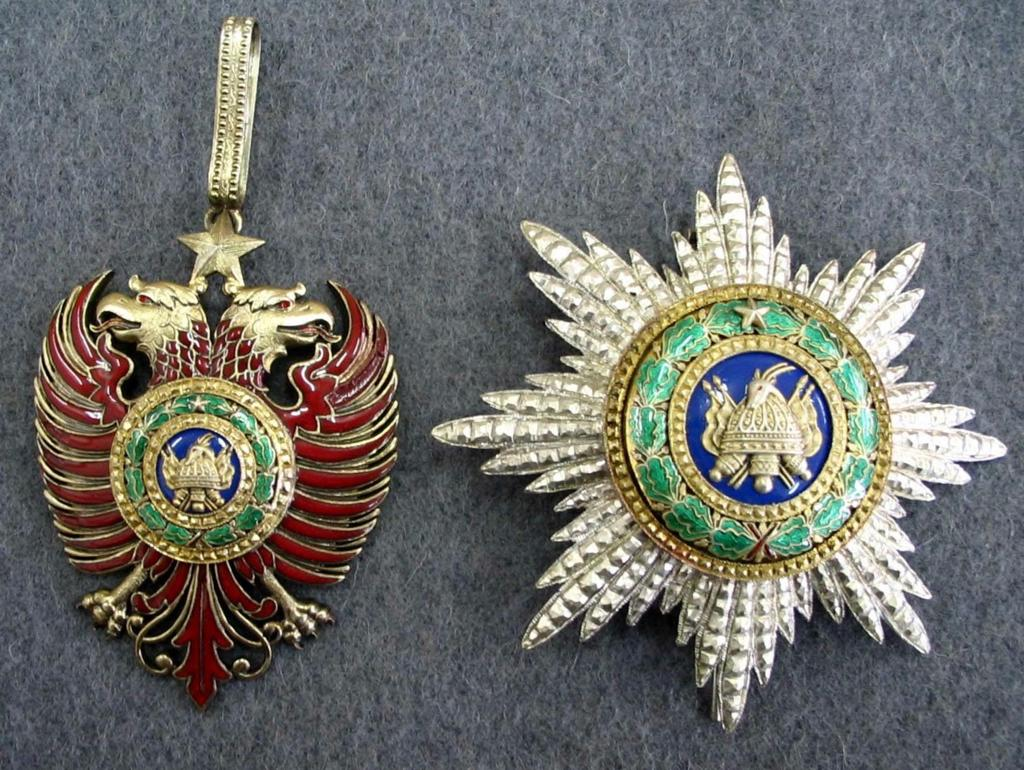
Grand Cross set of insignia.

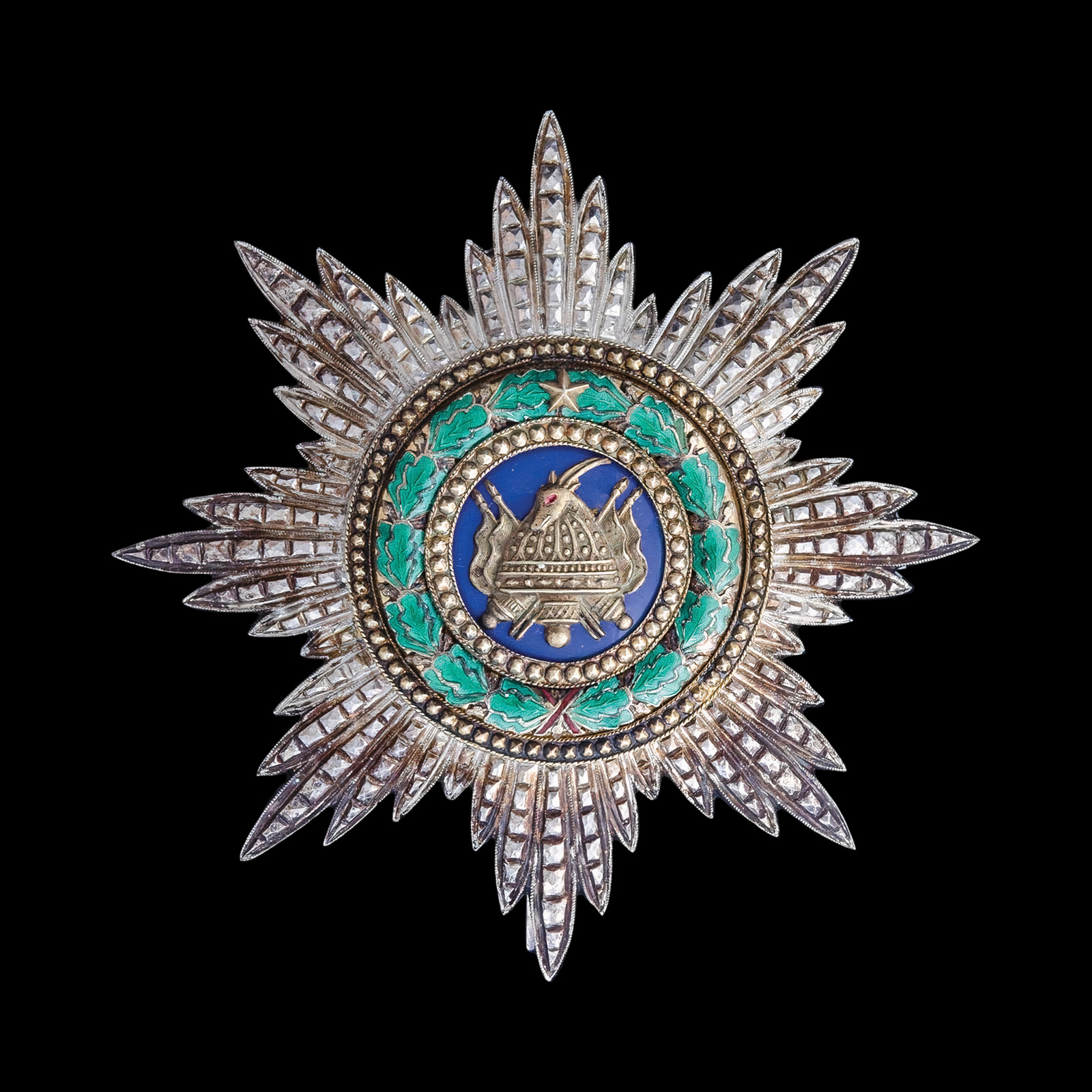
Grand Cross star. c.1935.

== See also ==
- Orders, decorations and medals of Albania
