= Royal Infantry of Albania =

Royal Albanian Infantry Forcat Mbretërore e Këmbsorisë
- Active: 1925–1939
- Disbanded: 1939
- Country: Albania
- Allegiance: Royal Albanian Army
- Branch: Infantry
- Type: Defence force
- Role: Protection of the Country
- Size: 441 officers, 740 NCOs and 8,000 soldiers
- Headquarter: Tirana
- Engagements: Italian Invasion of Albania

Commanders
- Commander on April 7, 1939: Cpt. Hamdi Jusufi
- Commander on April 7, 1939: Maj. Kastriot Bajraktor
- Commander on April 7, 1939: Maj. Sabe Gjilani

The Royal Albanian Infantry (Albanian: Forcat Mbretërore e Këmbsorisë) existed from 1928 to 1939 and was part of the Royal Albanian Army.

== Structure ==
The original plan was for the army to have three "infantry groups"(="Grupit Këmbsorisë"), each of three infantry battalions, three mountain batteries (2 x 65mm L/17), an engineer company and supporting elements such as transport, logistics and signals. Grupit I seems to have never been formed, but Grupit II and Grupit III did exist before 1939, both headquartered at Tirana. Apparently, these were no longer constituted on April 7, and the former commander of Grupit II had, by that date, become commander of Zona I.

In 1939, only seven of the nine planned infantry battalions were active:

- Battalion *Recruiting Center *Commander, 1939
- Tarabosh *Shkodër *Cpt. Hamdi Jusufit
- Korata *Tirana
- Deja *Tirana *Maj. Kastriot Bajraktori
- Daijti *Tirana
- Kaptina *Elbasan
- Tomori *Berat *Maj. Sabe Gjilanit?
- Gramos *Korçe

Battalions were named for mountains A full-strength battalion (="batalion", abbreviation "Baon.") documented partly by film footage, was organized as follows:

- Hqs
- 3 infantry companies (="kompani")
- Co Hqs ca. 15-20 men
- 3 platoons (= "togë") 35 men
- Platoon Leader (= "toger")
- NCO (="nëntoger")
- 3 squads (="skuadra")
- NCO (="nënoficerë")
- 10 corporals and soldiers
- 1 machine gun company
- Plt Hqs
- 3 machine gun platoons
- Plt Hqs
- 4 Fiat or Schwarzelose machine guns
- battalion train
- wagons/mules

Contrary to reports, there were no light machine guns at squad level. A reported strength of 21 officers, 37 NCOs and 422 corporals and privates was almost certainly the light establishment. A light establishment battalion had only two rifle companies with the third in cadre, and on paper, its machine gun company had only two platoons, but in practice there were only enough machine guns in service for two platoons in any situation.
