= Josef Fitzthum =

German Waffen-SS commander, SS-Gruppenführer

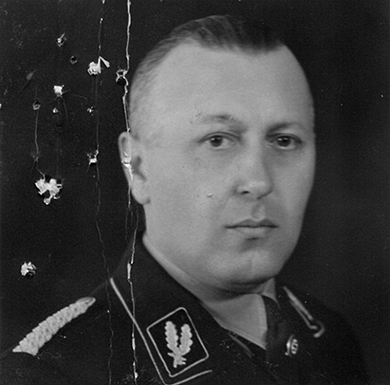
- Fitzthum in 1938
- Born: Josef Fitzthum; 14 September 1896; Loimersdorf, Lower Austria, Austria-Hungary
- Died: 10 January 1945 (aged 48); Wiener Neudorf, Reichsgau Niederdonau, Nazi Germany
- Military career
- Allegiance: Austria-Hungary; Nazi Germany
- Branch: Austro-Hungarian Army; Waffen SS
- Service years: 1916–1918 (Austria); 1936–1945 (Germany)
- Rank: SS-Gruppenführer Beauftragter des Reichsführer-SS Albanien
- Commands: SS Division Horst Wessel; 21st Waffen Mountain Division of the SS Skanderbeg; SS-Totenkopfverbände
- Conflicts: World War I World War II
- Awards: See Awards Section

Josef Fitzthum (14 September 1896 – 10 January 1945) was a high-ranking Austrian member of the Schutzstaffel (SS) and Special Representative of the Reichsführer-SS in Albania during World War II. A commander of the Waffen-SS, he was killed in a car accident toward the end of the war.

== Career ==
Born in 1896, Josef Fitzthum enlisted in the Austro-Hungarian Army in 1916 and was deployed to the Italian front. In January 1919 he was dismissed from the army, and from 1923 to 1933 he worked as a secretary at the Vienna School of Applied Arts. Fitzthum joined the Nazi Party in 1931 (membership number 363,169) and in 1932, the SS (membership number 41,936). In April 1932 he joined the XI SS Standard in Vienna, which he led from September 1932 for six months. Fitzhum served time in prison for embezzlement and illegal Nazi activities. After his expatriation from Austria, starting in March 1936, he was appointed a full-time SS-Standartenführer. In May 1936 he was posted to the SS Germania.

From October 1937 to March 1938, he was involved in Sicherheitsdienst (SD) activities. Following the Anschluss he was appointed deputy chief of police in Vienna from 12 March 1938 to March 1940. In March 1938, he was involved in several high-profile meetings and public ceremonies with Heinrich Himmler, Kurt Daluege, Karl Wolff, Reinhard Heydrich and Ernst Kaltenbrunner reviewing Austrian police forces in Vienna. However, in 1940 he was removed from this post following accusations of corruption. At the April 1938 parliamentary election, he was elected as a deputy to the Reichstag from Ostmark and retained this seat until his death. In 1940, Fitzthum was transferred to the Waffen-SS and appointed as an infantry commander in the SS-Totenkopfverbände. Between mid-April 1942 and May 1943, he was in the Netherlands as a commander for the establishment of the Aufstellung von Freiwilligen-Verbänden der Waffen-SS (voluntary associations of the Waffen-SS).

== Appointment to Albania ==
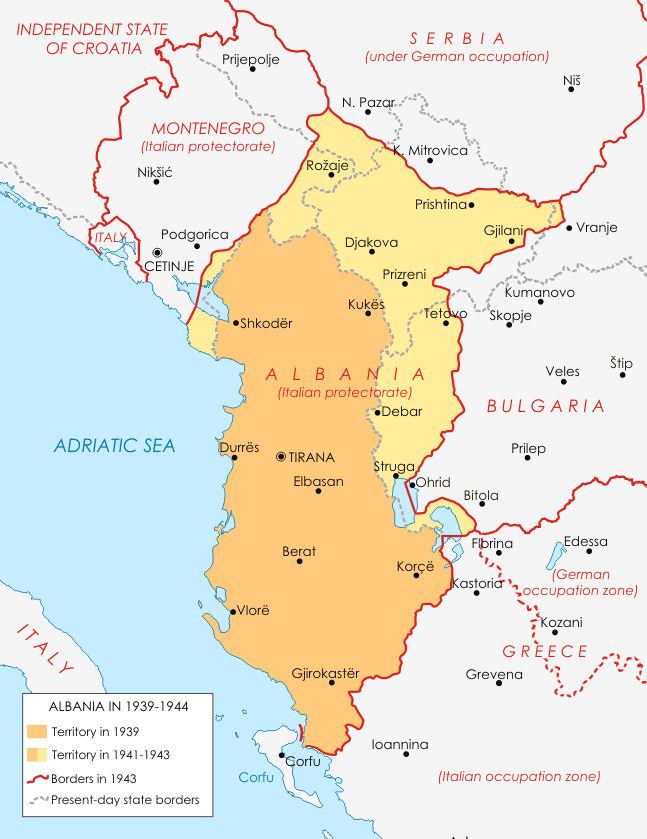
Albania during World War II

From October 1943 to 1 January 1945 Fitzthum was appointed Special Representative of the Reichsführer-SS by Heinrich Himmler to act as his personal plenipotentiary in Albania. As a former Vienna police chief Fitzthum's main stated task was to rebuild the Albanian police force. However, he soon conceived the idea of raising an Albanian Legion as the Austrians had done here during World War I but within the Waffen-SS. Consequently, from April to June 1944 Fitzthum organized the recruitment and training of the 21st Waffen Mountain Division of the SS Skanderbeg (1st Albanian).

Inside Albanian wartime politics, he was a vocal opponent of collaborating with the Zogist / Royalist faction. An experienced political infighter, Fitzthum rapidly monopolized both the Reich powers in Albania (usurping even those of the German Foreign Ministry) and the local Albanian political systems of administration. In August 1944 he was promoted to SS-Gruppenführer und Generalleutnant der Waffen-SS and granted very broad powers. In September 1944, he directly appointed a three-man "control committee" for Tirana including Prengë Previzi (an obscure collaborating politician), the formal head of the Albanian secret police under the Nazis, and General Gustav von Myrdacz (an Austrian military officer who had retired to Tirana after World War I).

"Regular army officers decried Fitzthum's rash of arrests as well as the transporting of some 400 Albanian prisoners out of Albania, directly contravening existing agreements." By 2 October 1944, when the Germans decided to formally evacuate Albania, Fitzthum was perhaps the most powerful man in the entire country. During the withdrawal, Fitzthum helped Xhafer Deva set up, arm and equip a local administration and defence force in Kosovo. Upon returning to Nazi Germany he was posted to the 18th SS Volunteer Panzergrenadier Division Horst Wessel as a commander from 3 to 10 January 1945, when Fitzthum was killed in a car accident in Wiener Neudorf. He was buried in Vienna.

== Bibliography ==
- Birn, Ruth Bettina (1986). Die Höheren SS- und Polizeiführer. Himmlers Vertreter im Reich und in den besetzten Gebieten. Droste. ISBN 3-7700-0710-7
- Bishop, Chris (2005). Hitler's Foreign SS Divisions. ISBN 1-8622-7289-1 or ISBN 978-1-862-27289-7
- Fischer, Bernd Jürgen (1999). Albania at War, 1939–1945. Purdue University Press, West Lafayette. ISBN 1-55753-141-2 or ISBN 978-1-557-53141-4
- Klee, Ernst (2007). Das Personenlexikon zum Dritten Reich. Frankfurt am Main, S. Fischer (Aktualisierte 2. Auflage). ISBN 978-3-596-16048-8
- Malcolm, Noel (2000). Kosovo: A Short History. New York University Press. New Update edition.
- Neubacher, Hermann (1956). Sonderauftrag Sudost. Musterschmidt.
- Sarner, Harvey (1997). Rescue In Albania: One Hundred Percent Of Jews In Albania Rescued From Holocaust. Brunswick Press, California. ISBN 1-8885-2111-2
