= Mustafa Aranitasi =

Albanian military commander and politician

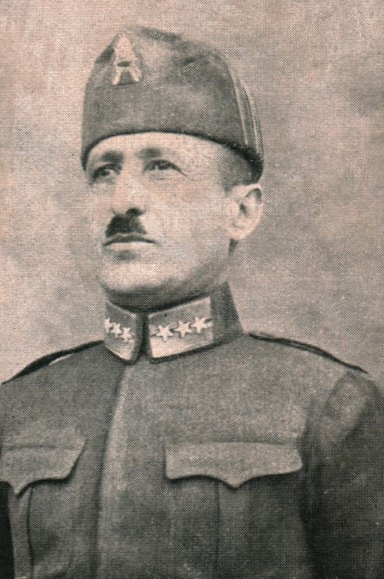

11th Defence Minister of Albania
- In office 19 August 1923 – 10 June 1924
- Preceded by: Ismail Haki Tatzati
- Succeeded by: Kasem Qafëzezi

Personal details
- Born: 12 April 1872 Aranitas, Mallakastër, Ottoman Albania
- Died: 26 April 1961 (aged 89) Tirana, People's Republic of Albania

Mustafa Aranitasi (12 April 1872 – 26 April 1961) was an Albanian military commander and politician who served as Minister of War on two separate terms during the 1920s. A Zog loyalist, he played an important role in the reformation of the Albanian Army during this time period.

== Biography ==
Mustafa Aranitasi was born on April 12, 1872, in the village of Aranitas, Mallakastër region. He attended the Military Academy in Istanbul. In July 1913, having been promoted to the rank of Major, he was selected as one of 4 commanders of the country's detachments formed by Dutch officers during the ministry of Mehmet Deralla. Together with Major Ismail Haki Tatzati, he was appointed head of the Korçë and Gjirokastër battalions. In 1915, Aranitasi served as commander of the gendarmerie in Mirditë and in the following three years, he joined the Austro-Hungarian forces as battalion commander.

From 1920–1922 he served as commander of the second regiment based in Tirana. Later he was appointed president of the Military Court with the rank of colonel. On August 19, 1923, Aranitasi took the position of Minister of War in the Zogu I Government.

On June 1, 1924, he was appointed commander of the anti-uprising operation for the south where he unsuccessfully ran for parliament on behalf of the National-Democratic group in Berat. After the triumph of the June Revolution, he emigrated to Italy fearing repercussions from the Noli Government. On December 12, 1924, the Political Court sentenced him in absentia to life imprisonment on charges of facilitating the distribution of weapons to Zog's forces and complicity in fratricide.

He returned to Albania after the Triumph of Legality on December 24, 1924, where he resumed his role as president of the Military Court until March 30, 1927, when he retired to private life.

In 1946, Aranitasi and his family were expelled from the capital Tirana by the communist regime and interned to Çermë, Lushnjë. He died after a brief illness at a hospital in Tirana on April 26, 1961.
