= Royal Guard of Albania =

Royal Albanian Guard Garda Mbretërore
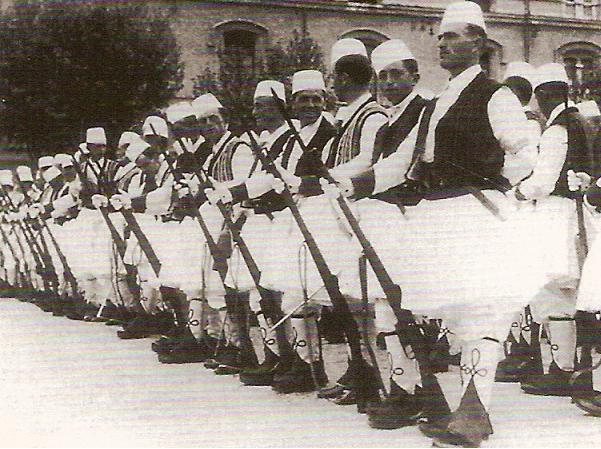
- The guard in 1936.
- Active: 1928 — 1939
- Disbanded: 1939
- Country: Albanian Kingdom
- Allegiance: HM The King of the Albanians
- Branch: Royal Albanian Army
- Type: Defence force
- Role: Protection of the King
- Size: 112 officers, 14 NCOs and 800 soldiers
- Headquarters: Tirana
- Engagements: Italian Invasion of Albania

Commanders
- Notable commanders: Captain Hysen Selmani

The Royal Guard (Albanian: Garda Mbretërore) was from 1928 till 1939 and was part of the Royal Albanian Army.

== History ==
Kingdom of Albania

On 1 September 1928, President Ahmet Zogu became Zog I, King of the Albanians and the Republican Guard changed its name to the "Royal Guard of Albania", with Captain Hysen Selmani appointed as its first commandant.

While half the army was deployed around the capital to protect the central government from civil unrest, the Royal Guard was to protect the King from assassination and military coups.

Exile

It’s believed that Leka Zogu asked Ian Smith, the Rhodesian Prime Minister, for help in staging a coup to take back power in Communist Albania. Smith declined, as the last thing he needed was being accused of financing a likely disastrous military coup in the highly militarized country of Albania.

The guard would later form what is now the Republican Guard.

== Structure ==
In April 1939 this reportedly had a strength of 926 officers and men:

- HQ
- Ceremonial Company
- Infantry Battalion (21 Officers; 37 Sub-Officer; 412 Guards)
  - HQ
  - 4 Rifle Companies
- Artillery Battery (4 Officers; 8 Sub-Officer; 140 Guards, 59 horses)
- Cavalry Squadron (71-91 Officers)
  - HQ
  - 3-4 Troops
- Royal Guards Band (34 musicians)
- Depot (1 Officer; 39 Guards)

== See also ==
- People's Socialist Republic of Albania
- Republican Guard (Albania)
