= Royal Albanian Army =

Army of the Albanian Kingdom in 1928–1939

- Ushtria Mbretnore Shqiptare
- Flag of the Albanian Royal Army
- Founded: 1928; 98 years ago
- Disbanded: 1939; 87 years ago
- Service branches: Royal Infantry; Royal Artillery; Royal Engineers; Royal Navy; Royal Air Corps; Royal Gendarmerie; Royal Guard; Royal Border Guard
- Headquarters: Tirana, Albania

Leadership
- Commander-in-Chief: Marshal Zogu
- Minister of Defence: Xhemal Aranitasi
- Chief of the General Staff: Gustav von Myrdacz

Personnel
- Military age: 18–36
- Conscription: 18 months
- Reserve personnel: 29,860
- Deployed personnel: 15,600

Expenditure
- Budget: Fr 21.3 million (1938 est.)

Industry
- Foreign suppliers: Kingdom of Italy; United Kingdom

Related articles
- History: International Gendarmerie; Italian invasion of Albania
- Ranks: Military ranks of the Albanian Kingdom

Royal Albanian Army with Zogu

The Royal Albanian Army (Albanian: Ushtria Mbretërore Shqiptare) was the army of the Albanian Kingdom and King Zog I of the Albanians from 1928 until 1939. Its commander-in-chief was King Zog; its commander was General Xhemal Aranitasi; its chief of staff was General Gustav von Myrdacz. The army was mainly financed by Italy from 1936 to 1939.

== List of weapons ==
=== Artillery ===
- Type 41 75 mm Mountain Gun
- Skoda 75 mm Model 1928
- Cannone da 65/17 modello 13
- Cannone da 75/27 modello 06

=== Machine Guns ===
- Schwarzlose MG M.07/12
- Fiat–Revelli Modello 1914
- Vickers machine gun
- Maxim gun

=== Rifles ===
- Carcano M1891
- M1870 Italian Vetterli
- Mannlicher M1895.
- Mannlicher–Schönauer
- Mauser M1893
- Mosin–Nagant

=== Pistols ===
- Glisenti Model 1910
- Bodeo Model 1889
- Beretta Model 1915

== Law on recruitment ==
- Article 1. Any male Albanian citizen is obliged to perform military service according to the provisions of this law.
- Article 2. Excluded from military service and cannot participate in the armed forces are those sentenced to life, as well as those who are sentenced to a punishment that entails the loss of civil rights, and the permanent loss of the right to serve State. An exception is made for political convicts who over time regain their civil rights.
- Article 3. Military duty begins on December 1 of the year in which boys turn 19 and enter their 20s, until December 31 of the year in which they turn 50. This service task is divided into three parts: a) the first part, which is 18 months and is spent in continuous service under arms, which is called active service; b) The second part, which is spent on release, except for calls that can be made and similar from the date of release from active service until December 31 of the year in which they reach 45 years of age; c) The third part, which is also spent on release from 31 December of the year in which they reach 45 years of age until 31 December of the year in which they reach 50 years old. This part is called second line army service.
- Article 4. The time of active service can be shortened for all or part of that class with the proposal of the Command of the Armed Forces, with the consent of the Ministerial Council and with the Presidential Decree.
- Article 5. All Albanian male citizens between the ages of 20 and 50 must have a document with them to present in any case that the Gendarmerie asks for, that document should prove that they have completed active military service from which they were regularly released. For the sharing and use of the document in question, measures will be taken in turn.
- From January 1 of the year in which the men reach the age of 18 until their service duties are completed, the aforementioned men cannot emigrate except when they have deposited, as a pledge, an amount of fr. 1000 gold in the State treasury, or in the other case, by means of a Notary's deed from fr. 1000 gold.

== Manpower and Equipment ==
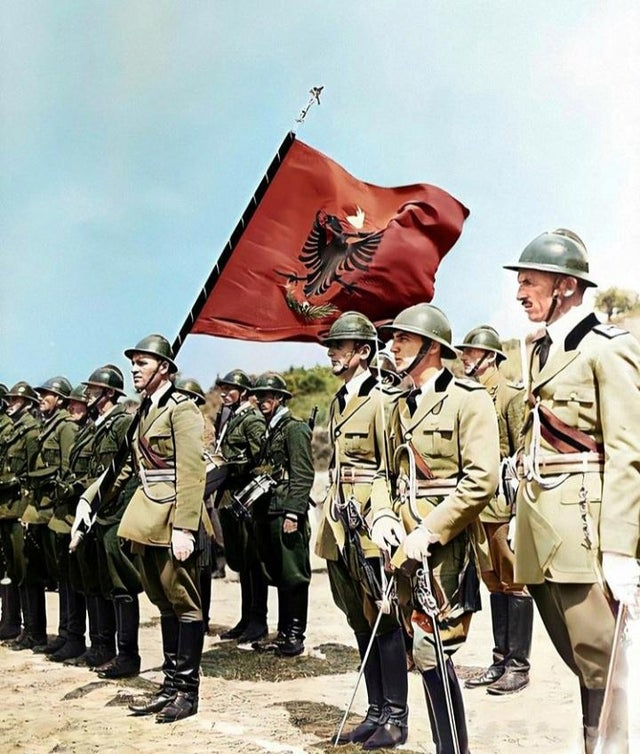
Honor guard of the Royal Albanian Army around 1939.

=== Army ===
- 780 officers + 13,200 soldiers + 1620 NCOs
- Around 43,960 conscripts (1939)
- 9 military districts
- 12 infantry battalions
- 2 motorized infantry squadrons
- 9 engineering companies
- 1200 tribal officers + 29,860 tribal militia
- 204 HMG
- 10,700 carbines (Carcano M1891, Mannlicher, Mosin)
- 1,104 revolvers (Glisenti M1889)
- 16,196 rifles (Beretta Model 38 &1918)
- 12 batteries of 65 mm Italian
- 6 batteries of 75 mm Škoda
- 2 batteries of 105 mm Italian
- 2 batteries of 149 mm Italian (8 guns)
- 1 coastal artillery battery in Durrës
- 3 AA artillery batteries
- 2 Fiat 3000B tanks
- 6 Ansaldo CV.33 tankettes
- 8 armored cars: 2 Bianchi, 6 Lancia IZM

==== Special branches ====
- For health service; (also for the Gendarmerie) is under the direction of the oldest doctor of the Tirana Garrison.
- For the veterinary service (also for the gendarmerie) is under the direction of the most senior veterinarian.
- For the court service (also for the Gendarmerie) is the Military Court in Tirana. The rights of court orders for subordinates belong to the Commander of the Armed Forces.
- For recruitment service (also for gendarmerie until this is completed with regular recruitment): 9 Recruitment Offices (according to the political division of Albania) with its own branches for each Sub-prefecture.
- For material service (maintenance work): General warehouse and subsidiary warehouses among several garrisons.; General warehouse workshop (for weapon repair).; Workshop for artillery and repair of automobiles.

=== Navy ===
- 158 personnel
- 2 gunboats (ex-German minesweepers type FM=Flachgehende Minensuchboote)
  - 170 t, 43/6/1.7 m, 14 kn., 76 mm gun, 2 MG
  - Built in 1918/19, bought c. 1925.
  - Shqipnja (ex-FM 16) & Skanderbeg (ex-FM 23)
- 4 Italian MAS boats
  - Built & bought in 1928 in Venice
  - 46 t, 17 kn., 76 mm gun, 2 MG
  - Tirana, Saranda, Durres, Shengjin
- 1 Royal Yacht "Ilirja".

=== Air Corps ===
- 5 Albatros L.47s (de-militarised C.XV) 2 airworthy in April 1939.

=== Gendarmerie ===
- 131 (officers) + 440 (NCO) + 3,206 (soldiers)
- 6 battalions (every battalion had 500–600 men)
- Behind vehicles are the numbers that were in use by the Albanian army.

=== Military education ===
- Aspirants' School in Tirana for Infantry and Artillery.
- Military Gymnasium in Tirana, (as preparation for higher military schools).
- Navy School in Durrës (for officers and noncommissioned Marine officers).

== Medals ==
The Albanian Kingdom had the below-mentioned Decorations:

- Order of Bravery
- Order of Fidelity (Besa)
- Order of Skanderbeg
- Medal of Bravery

According to the Law on Decorations (May 1930), "the King wore whatever Decoration he desired." Decorations were granted only by Royal Decree.

The Order of Bravery consisted of the following classes:

1. Hero
2. Slaughterer
3. Brave.

The Order of Bravery was awarded to officers and soldiers of all the Armed Forces of the King who showed extraordinary acts of bravery in wartime. The Order was the highest decoration awarded in times of war. Those who were given the Order of Bravery were given a monthly gift for 100-250 gold francs. In the event that the recipient died, the monthly gift was fully inherited by the members of his family who had the right to inherit the salary according to the Pension Law. The provision did not affect the right to receive the pension obtained by other laws.

The Order of Fidelity (Besa) consisted of these classes:

1. Grand Officer
2. Knight.

The Order of Fidelity was given for special merits towards the country.

The Order of Skanderbeg consisted of the following classes:

1. Grand Cord
2. Grand Officer
3. Commander
4. Officer
5. Knight.

The Order of Skanderbeg was given to all those who showed valuable services to the nation.

The Medal of Bravery was awarded to all those military or civilian personnel who had earned commendable merits through acts of bravery.

In 1936, a "Gendarmerie Medal" was created for meritorious service in the Royal Gendarmerie. The ribbon of the medal was black with four thin red stripes. The number of medals that would be made was not defined. On the front side of the medal was the face of the King, and on the other side was written the words: "For meritorious service" in the middle, and "Medal of the Gendarmerie" around.

This medal was awarded to the staff of the Gendarmerie for meritorious service. In exceptional cases, with the proposal of the Gendarmerie General Command, the medal could be awarded to other members of the armed forces and civilians who have rendered meritorious service in helping the Gendarmerie.

== See also ==
- Military ranks of the Albanian Kingdom
- Albanian Armed Forces
- Zogu
- Zogist salute
- Royal Border Guard

== Bibliography ==
- Crociani, Piero (2001). Gli Albanesi Nelle Forze Armate Italiane (1939–1943) [Albanians in the Italian Armed Forces (1939-1943)] (in Italian). Andrea Viotti, illustrator. Rome: Stato maggiore dell'esercito, Ufficio storico (Army General Staff, Historical Office). ISBN 9788887940251.
- Fischer, Bernd (1999). Albania at War, 1939–1945. Central European Studies. West Lafayette, IN: Purdue University Press. doi:10.2307/j.ctt9qh14k. ISBN 9781557531414. JSTOR stable/j.ctt9qh14k. LCCN 98046675.
- Najbor, Patrice (2008). Histoire de l'Albanie et de sa maison royale [History of Albania and its Royalty] (in French). Paris: JePublie. ISBN 978-2-9532382-0-4.
- Najbor, Patrice (2002). La dynastie des Zogu [Zog's Reign]. Textes & Prétextes (in French). Paris: Patrice Najbor.
- "A Birth and a Death". Time. 17 April 1939. Archived from the original on 14 December 2008.
- "ALBANIA: Zog, Not Scanderbeg". Time. 17 June 1929. Archived from the original on 8 August 2009.
- "Janes Fighting Ships", London, various years
- Armaments Year-book (Report). Geneva: League of Nations. various years 1924–1938
- "6,5 mm machinegun M/14 Schwarzlose | MACHINEGUNS PART 2: Other machineguns". jaegerplatoon.net. Finland. 4 November 2017.
- e-archives of Korrieri, Tiranë Gazeta and other Albanian newspapers
- on-line articles of the Albanian Headquarters and General Staff website
- on-line articles of Ushtria Gazeta (Army Gazette)
