= Royal Engineers of Albania =

Royal Albanian Engineers Forcat Mbretërore Të Xhenios
- Active: 1925–1939
- Disbanded: 1939
- Country: Albania
- Allegiance: Royal Albanian Army
- Branch: Engineer
- Size: 22 (officers)+ 9 (Engineer company)
- Headquarter: Tirana
- Engagements: Italian Invasion of Albania

The Royal Albanian Engineers (Albanian: Forcat Mbretërore të Xhenios) was part of the Royal Albanian Army from 1928 to 1939.

== Structure ==
Engineers ("rmët e Xhenios) Of four planned companies "ZM" (sappers-miners), three were active in 1939:

- HQ
- 9 Engineer platoons
- A bridging section or column also existed at army level (seksion urahedhës)

As in the Italian army the engineers included signal and transport troops. One combined Wire, Radio and Telephone Company (kompani glihdjës radio e telephone) served the needs of the entire army:

- CO (1 riding horse)
- HQ 1 truck/driver
- Section RT
- 1 car
- 3 horses
- 6 radio stations R-3 (mule transport) [R-3: a morse set of 35 km range, 2000–2500 kHz (stations attached to military zone)]
- 2 radio stations R-5 (truck-borne) [R-5: 150 km voice/350 km morse, 158–476 kHz (at army level)]
- Section Wire/Telephone
- Section Photo-Electric (12 mules)

Motor transport centered on the automobile unit (autoreparti) at Tirana (Maj. Halil Plaves). This consisted of the following:

- HQ
- Material Depot
- Benzine Depot
- automotive workshop
- and presumably, a driving school (600 trained drivers were available to the army).

A separate Ambulance Section existed, but it is unclear if this was attached to the Medical Troops or to the Automobile Unit.

Motor transport was attached to the various command HQs and the HQs of engineer and artillery units, otherwise about 250 trucks were in pool for major lifts; the vehicle inventory as of 1936 comprised 200 cars and light trucks, 300 2-ton – 3-ton trucks and 20 buses. Types in service included Fiat 15ter, Fiat 521/521C, Fiat 525, Lancia I2 M, and a number of Romanian-built Ford cars and light trucks.

There was no cavalry arm; the transportation troops controlled the Armored Car and Tank Squadron (Skuadriljë e Automjesh dhë Tankesh) at Tirana. In 1939 this had 2 Fiat 3000 (machine gun version) tanks, 6 Lancia IZ and 2 Fiat armored cars and 6 Ansaldo CV3/33 tankettes (1938). It is unknown how many were still running in 1939.

No motorized infantry existed as such; the armored squadron and motorized field battery may be the "two motorized units" reported. But note that Albania was in a position to provide motorized lift for some foot infantry units, within the limits of the road system. (There were about 2200 km of government-maintained roads suitable for motor vehicles, and another 400 km maintained by various communes.)

A so-called "support company" TOE existed; it is unclear if this was a permanent formation or was created ad hoc to support units in the field.

- CO HQ
- 1 car
- 1 riding horse (CO)
- Transport Unit
- 24 horses (6-12 wagons?)
- Mule HQ
- mule pack trains
- Logistic HQ
- 1 truck
- mules/wagons?
