= Ismail Haki Tatzati =

Albanian politician (1878–1945)

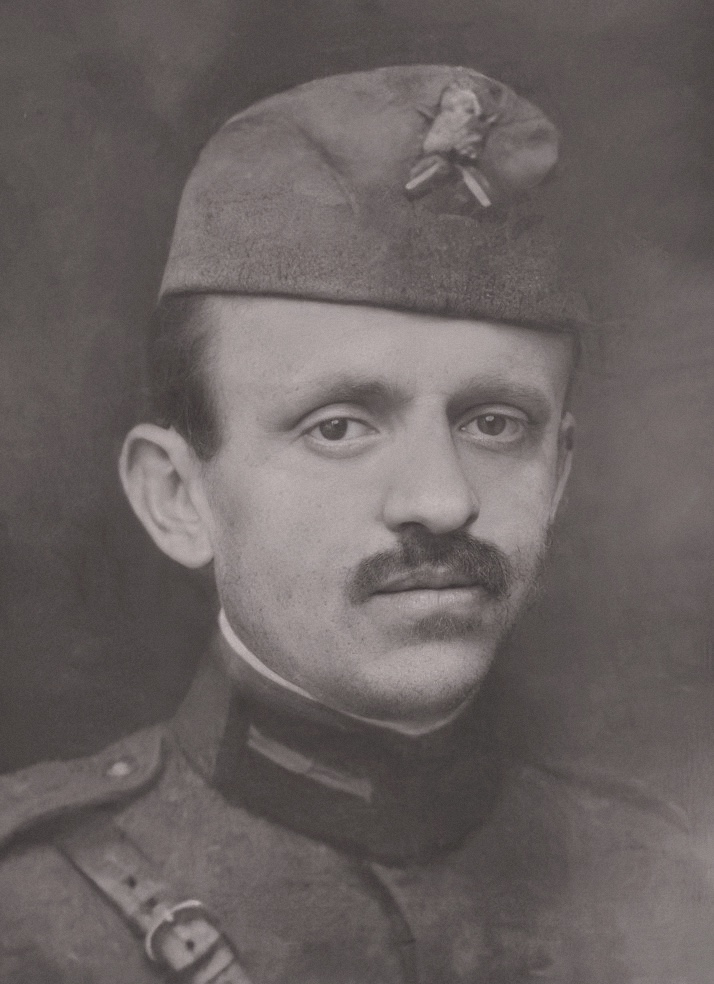

10th Defence Minister of Albania
- In office 24 December 1921 – 19 August 1923
- Preceded by: Shefki Kosturi
- Succeeded by: Mustafa Aranitasi

Personal details
- Born: 1878 Delvinë, Ottoman Empire
- Died: 3 August 1945 (aged 66–67) Gjirokastër, Albania
- Party: Balli Kombëtar
- Profession: Army commander and politician

Ismail Haki Tatzati (1878 – 3 August 1945) was an Albanian military commander and politician who served as Minister of War. He later became part of Balli Kombëtar.

== Biography ==
He was born in 1878 in Delvinë. In 1894–1897 he attended the Gymnasium of Manastir, in 1897–1900 he attended and graduated from the Military Academy of Istanbul. In 1900–1905 he served as an officer in Serres in the Vilayet of Thessaloniki and then until 1906 he went to serve in Istanbul. In 1906–1908 he served in Gjirokastër, then until 1913 in Elbasan, where he earned the rank of major. In 1913 he led a gendarmerie battalion also Elbasan, where he was imprisoned and then released by the insurgents of Central Albania on 14 May. With the gendarmerie organized by the Dutch mission, he was assigned with Mustafa Aranitas to command the battalions of Korça and Gjirokastra. During the fighting with the Greek forces, Tatzati made Hoçisht the center of operations. In 1916–18 he was a sub-prefect in the zone of Austro-Hungarian occupation and administration. In the first half of 1920 he was the commander of the gendarmerie of the Gjirokastra district, receiving orders from Tirana to move with his troops towards the capital, where this unit was tasked with attacking the followers of Essad Toptani.

On 14 December 1920, he was appointed the commander of the 3rd army regiment in Shkodër. He participated in the military operation to suppress the Republic of Mirdita. In the governments of Xhafer Ypi and Ahmet Zogu, he was Minister of War in the period 1921–'23 until he was replaced by Mustafa Aranitasi on 19 August 1923. In 1923, he was commander of the 2nd army group in Tirana. In 1923, he was elected deputy of the Gjirokastra prefecture, a mandate he held until 6 February 1925, when it was revoked. He supported the June Revolution in 1924 and with the arrival of Zogu in December, he fled Albania.

Having been part of the Krahu Kombëtar, in emigration he was part of the Bashkimi Kombëtar, in the years 1936–39 he was a political emigrant in Greece. He returned to his homeland in 1939 and refused to accept the offered positions. During World War II he joined the Balli Kombëtar, for which he was sentenced to death and shot in Gjirokastër on 3 August 1945.
