= Gustav von Myrdacz =

Austrian noble (1874–1945)

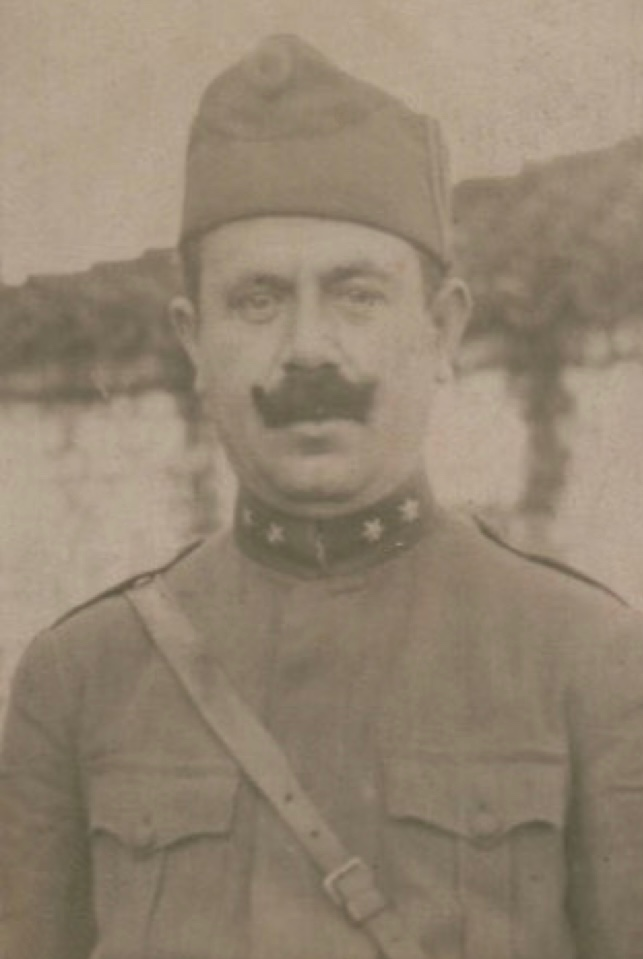
- Born: 12 July 1874; Vienna, Austro-Hungarian Empire
- Died: 11 July 1945 (aged 70) Tirana, Albania
- Allegiance: Austro-Hungarian Empire; Albanian Kingdom
- Rank: Division general
- Conflicts: World War I; World War II
- Spouse: Ida (née Heller-Fiedler)

Gustav von Myrdacz (12 July 1874 – died 11 July 1945) was an Austrian noble who was instrumental in organizing the Royal Albanian Army from the early 1920s to 1945. He was referred to in Albania as Gustav Mirdashi.

== Early life and training ==
Gustav von Myrdacz was born in Vienna, Austro-Hungarian Empire, on 12 July 1874 in a German-speaking Silesian aristocratic family. His father, Paul von Myrdacz (4 May 1847 – 7 July 1930), who was born in Konská (Třinec), pursued a career as a military doctor in the Austro-Hungarian Army. He was involved in the occupation of Bosnia in 1878 and spent time there in the 1880s.

Gustav von Myrdacz was raised in the multi-lingual multi-cultural environment of the late Habsburg Empire and was trained to become a military engineer. He attended high school in Vienna at the Theresian Military Academy (Theresianischen Militärakademie) in Wiener Neustadt, and in 1897 was posted to the Habsburg Austrian Military Police Battalion Number 32 in Galicia. From 1901 to 1903 he attended the Military School of the General Staff College (Kriegsschule der Generalstabsakademie) and served in various infantry brigades as a staff officer after 1904. From 1909 onwards, he was a tactical instructor at the Imperial and Royal Technical Military Academy in Mödling. He additionally trained wild horses from the ages of 8 to 19.

== World War I ==
When World War I began in 1914, von Myrdacz served as an officer in Sarajevo. In December 1915, he was attached to the General Division of the XIX Corps under General Ignaz Trollmann. He helped Austria conquer and occupy Serbia and enter northern Albania to engage Italian soldiers.

From 1 May 1917, von Myrdacz commanded the border guard battalion IV (Grenzjägerbataillon IV), before becoming the chief of staff to the 14th Infantry Division, which was assigned to the Italian front. He participated in the Battles of the Isonzo here. In 1918, partly because of his involvement in the occupation of Albania, von Myrdacz was introduced to a young honorary colonel named Ahmed Zog in Vienna.

On 5 January 1918, von Myrdacz was appointed colonel in the General Staff Corps (Oberst im Generalstabskorps). From 16 July 1918, he commanded the last offensive of Austria-Hungary in Venetia when he led Infantry Regiment No. 117 on the Tonale Pass in Tyrol. A day after the armistice, he was captured as a prisoner of war in Italy. He was acquitted a year later. Returning to the Republic of Austria, von Myrdacz was appointed commander at the State Office of Styria. He was then posted to Graz, where his father had retired, to become a Stellvertretender Stadtkommandant (deputy militia commandant).

== Albania ==
In 1920, von Myrdacz retired from service in Austria at the rank of brigadier-general and joined the newly formed Albanian army at the invitation of Ahmed Zog. Three years later he accepted a commission to become chief of staff. He joined a group of foreign nationals advising the Albanian government under Zog, including Leon Ghilardi from Dalmatia, and Lieutenant-Colonel Walter Francis Stirling and Major-General Sir Jocelyn Percy from Britain. Most of his duties, beyond training officers and small military formations in basic maneuvers, involved building military roads.

In 1928, the new Fascist regime in Italy tried to increase influence and power within Albania, and General Alberto Pariani was sent as a military "advisor". The Albanian Prime Minister Ahmed Zog sidestepped the Italian military mission and appointed himself as Chief of General Staff. The following year, Zog made himself King of Albania, and von Myrdacz was immediately entrusted as chief of staff of the Royal Albanian Army. It suited Zog and the Albanians to have their army trained by a man who had fought the Italians. Italy invaded Albania on 7 April 1939, when von Myrdaczy and other high-ranking Albanian officers were not present. Zog escaped to Greece, leaving the country without defense, and Albania was occupied in three days without any resistance.

When the Royal Albanian Army was dissolved, von Myrdacz lost his position but chose to stay in Tirana. With the capitulation of Italy on 8 September 1943, General Pervizi became Minister of Defense, with von Myrdacz serving as a liaison officer between the Albanian army and the German forces. General Pervizi did not allow the recruitment of Albanian soldiers for the SS, resulting in a breach with the Germans. In November 1944 the German forces withdrew from Albania. Von Myrdacz was advised to join the retreating forces in Austria, but again decided to remain in Tirana.

== Execution ==
In September 1944, SS Standartenführer Josef Fitzthum (a fellow Austrian) directly appointed a three-man "control committee" for Tirana, including two obscure Albanians and von Myrdacz. The following month, the Germans evacuated Tirana. The Communist partisans of Enver Hoxha captured and tried von Myrdacz in the Special Court of Spring 1945 as a "pro-Fascist" and "enemy of the people". He was executed in July 1945.

== Decorations ==
- Austrian orders
- Turkish war decoration
- Grand Cordon of Skanderbeg Order (Order of Skanderbeg)

== Literature ==
- Bernd Jürgen Fischer: Albania at War, 1939–1945. Purdue University Press, West Lafayette 1999; ISBN 1-55753-141-2
- Anton Wagner, Der Erste Weltering (Herold Verlag, 1993); ISBN 3-901183-04-3
- H. Schwanke, Zur Gesch. d. österr.-ungar. Militärverw. in Albanien 1916–18 (Vienna, 1982)
- Janusz Piekalkiewicz, Krieg auf d. Balkan 1940–45 (Munich: Sudwest Verlag, 1984)
- Nikolaus von Preradovich, Österreichs höhere SS-Fuehrer (1987)
- M. Schmidt-Neke, Albanien, Geschichtl. Grundlagen, in: Südosteuropa-Hdb. VII, 1993, pages 26–56.
