= Military ranks of the Albanian Kingdom =

The Military ranks of the Albanian Kingdom were the military ranks used by the Royal Albanian Army. Throughout its short history, the Albanian Kingdom had two ranks systems. The first rank system lasting from 1929 till 1936, with the second lasting till the end of the kingdom in 1939.

== Ranks (1929–1936) ==
Officers

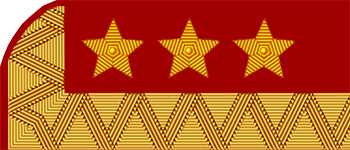
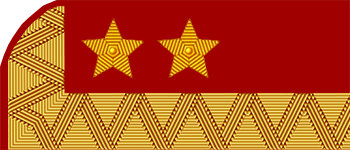
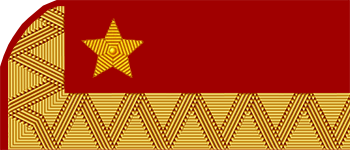
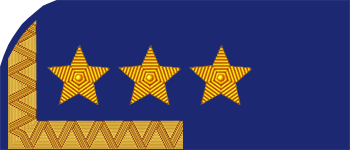
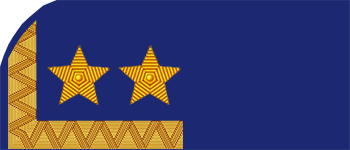
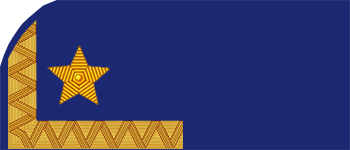
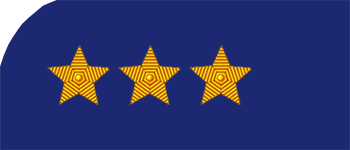
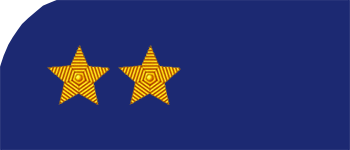
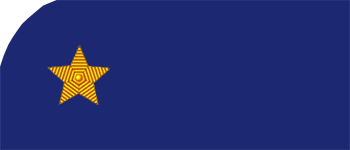
| Rank group | General / flag officers | | | Senior officers | | | Junior officers |
|---|---|---|---|---|---|---|---|---|---|
| Insignia |
| Albanian | Gjeneral | Gjeneral-leitenant | Gjeneral-major | Kolonel | Nënkolonel | Major | Kapiten | Toger | Nëntoger |
| English | General | Lieutenant general | Major general | Colonel | Lieutenant colonel | Major | Captain | Lieutenant | Junior lieutenant |

Other ranks

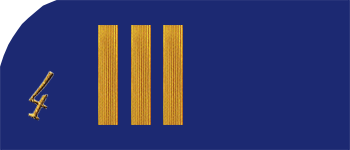
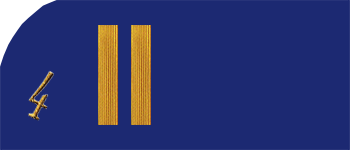
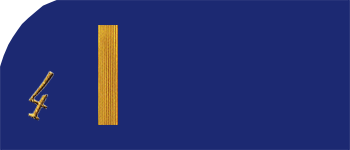
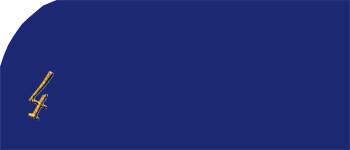
| Rank group | Senior NCOs | Junior NCOs | Enlisted |
|---|---|---|---|---|
| Insignia |
| Albanian | Rreshter | Tetar | Ushtar I parë | Ushtar |
| English | Sergeant | Corporal | Private first class | Private |

== Ranks (1936–1939) ==
Officers

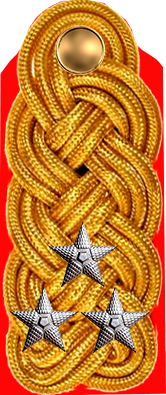
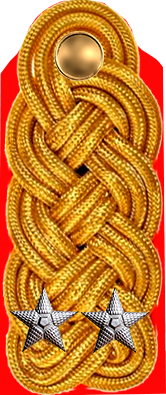
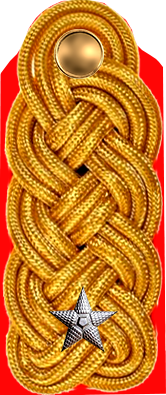
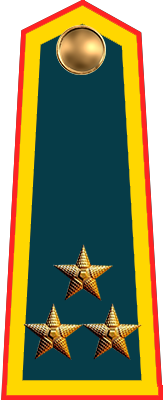
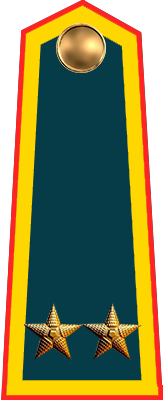
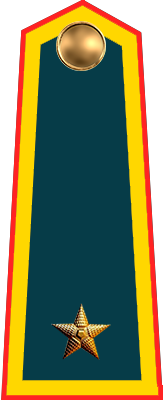
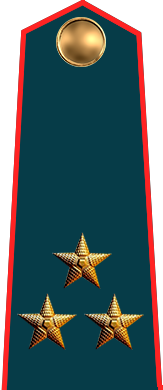
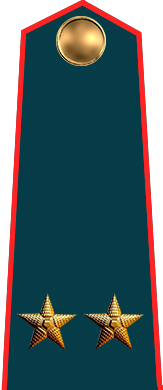
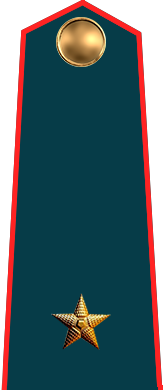
| Rank group | General / flag officers | | | Senior officers | | | Junior officers |
|---|---|---|---|---|---|---|---|---|---|
| Hat |
| Insignia |
| Albanian | Gjeneral | Gjeneral-leitenant | Gjeneral-major | Kolonel | Nënkolonel | Major | Kapiten | Toger | Nëntoger |
| English | General | Lieutenant general | Major general | Colonel | Lieutenant colonel | Major | Captain | Lieutenant | Junior lieutenant |

Other ranks

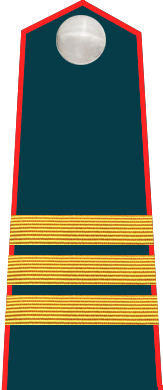
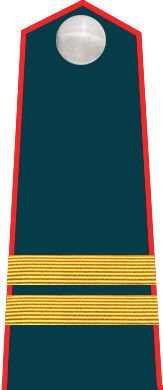
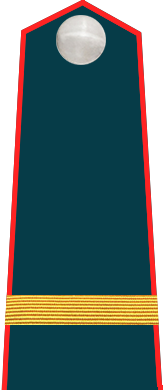
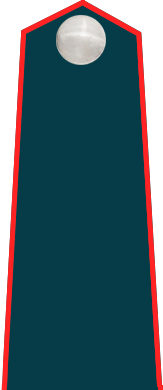
| Rank group | Senior NCOs | Junior NCOs | Enlisted |
|---|---|---|---|---|
| Hat |
| Insignia |
| Albanian | Rreshter | Tetar | Ushtar I parë | Ushtar |
| English | Sergeant | Corporal | Private first class | Private |
