= Albatros C.XV =

German military reconnaissance aircraft

C.XV
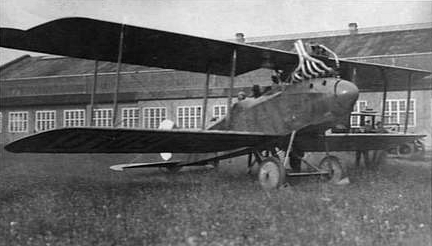
- A civil Albatros C.XV at Berlin-Johannisthal, 1919

General information
- Type: Reconnaissance aircraft
- Manufacturer: Albatros Flugzeugwerke
- Primary user: Germany

The Albatros C.XV was a German military reconnaissance aircraft developed during World War I. It was essentially a refinement of the C.XII, which had been put into production in 1918. The war ended before any examples became operational. However, some found their way into civilian hands and flew as transport aircraft in peacetime under the factory designation L 47. Others saw service with the air forces of Russia, Turkey, and Latvia.

== Operators ==
German Empire

- Luftstreitkräfte

Latvia

- Latvian Air Force

Lithuania

- Lithuanian Air Force

Poland

- Polish Air Force (postwar)

Soviet Union

- Soviet Air Force

Turkey

- Turkish Air Force

Albania

- Royal Albanian Air Corps

== Specifications (C.XV) ==
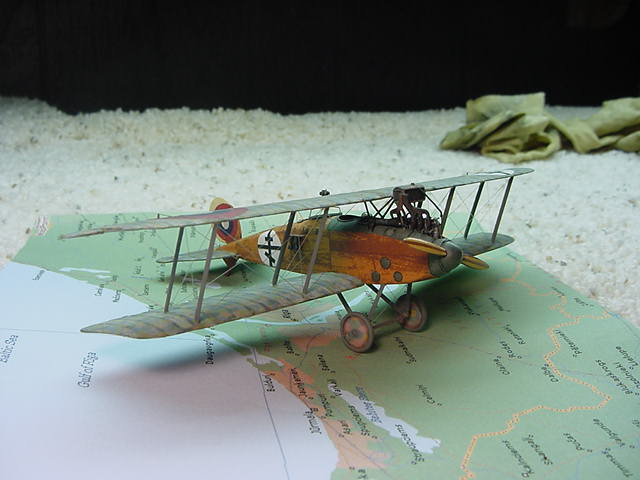
1/72 scale model of an Albatros C.XV of the Russian Civil War by Buz Pezold

General characteristics

- Crew: two, pilot and observer
- Length: 8.85 m (29 ft 0 in)
- Wingspan: 14.37 m (47 ft 2 in)
- Height: 3.25 m (10 ft 8 in)
- Wing area: 42.7 m^{2} (459 sq ft)
- Empty weight: 1,021 kg (2,250 lb)
- Gross weight: 1,639 kg (3,613 lb)
- Powerplant: 1 × Mercedes D.IVa , 190 kW (260 hp)

Performance

- Maximum speed: 175 km/h (110 mph, 96 kn)
- Service ceiling: 5,000 m (16,400 ft)

Armament

- 1 × forward-firing 7.92 mm (.312 in) Spandau LMG 08/15 machine gun
- 1 × 7.92 mm (.312 in) Parabellum MG14 machine gun for observer
