= Vlora (disambiguation) =

Vlora is a city in southwestern Albania on the Adriatic Sea.

Vlora may also refer to:

== People ==
- Eqrem Vlora (1885–1964), Albanian nobleman, politician, writer and statesman
- Nermin Vlora Falaschi (1921–2004), Albanian intellectual and feminist
- Syreja Vlora (1860–1940), Albanian politician and statesman
- Vlora Beđeti (born 1991), Slovenian-Albanian judoka
- Vlora Çitaku (born 1980), Albanian politician and diplomat
- Zyhdi Vlora, Albanian politician and statesman

== Other uses ==
- KF Vlora, Albanian football club
- Vlora (ship), Italian-Albanian cargo ship

== See also ==
- Principality of Valona
- Vlora of Albania (disambiguation)
- Vlorë (disambiguation)
