= Vlorë (disambiguation) =

Vlorë is a city in southwestern Albania on the Adriatic Sea.

Vlorë may also refer to:

- Vlorë County, an administrative county surrounding Vlorë
- Vlorë District, a former administrative district surrounding Vlorë
- Bay of Vlorë, the bay where Vlorë is geographically located
- Port of Vlorë, the harbour of the city of Vlorë
- Vlorë frank, former currency of Vlorë

== See also ==
- Principality of Valona
- Vlora (disambiguation)
