= Korçë Skënder =

The Skënder was the currency of Korçë, Albania, issued in 1921. It was subdivided into 100 qint. The currency was introduced after the period of French occupation and replaced the frange. It was only issued in paper money form, with notes in denominations of 25 and 50 qint, 1 and 20 skender. It was ultimately succeeded by the Albanian lek in 1926.
