= 1 Lek =

Albanian coin

1 lek
- Albania
- Value: 1 lek
- Mass: 3 g
- Diameter: 18.1 mm
- Edge: Smooth
- Composition: Copper-covered steel (in 2008 and 2013), bronze (1996)
- Years of minting: Since 1926

Obverse
- Design: "Republic of Albania" minted on top, mint year on bottom, and a pelican in the middle.

Reverse
- Design: Nominal value and a crown wreath.

The 1 Lek coin has a value of one lek and is composed of copper-covered steel (2008 and 2013 issues) or bronze (1996), depicting a Dalmatian pelican on its obverse. The 1 Lek coin was firstly minted in 1926 and has been redesigned several times.

== History ==
The coin dates from 1926, when Albania minted its first Lek coins. The obverse side featured a lion, the year 1926, and "Shqipni". During Albania's Italian rule, it featured the fasces and during Communist regime the coin featured the Albanian coat of arms. In 1969, the national bank minted coins to commemorate the 25th anniversary of Albanian Liberation.

Under the democratic government, the coin was redesigned and reminted in 1996 featuring its current design.

== Design ==
The coins are composed of copper-covered steel, with a diameter of 18 mm and a mass of 3 grams. The coins' edges are smooth. The coins have been used from 1997.

=== Obverse side ===
The obverse side features the mint year, "Republic of Albania" writing and a pelican in the center.

=== Reverse side ===
The reverse side of the coin features its value and a crown wreath.

== Usage ==
While still legal tender, one lek coins do not find much usage currently. Their value, roughly one euro cent, is so small that many Albanian residents will refuse to accept these coins as change from markets, unintentionally creating a system similar to take a penny, leave a penny.

== Nicknames ==
The coin is sometimes referred to as a "pelikan" (pelican) because of its reverse design.
