= Falaschi =

Falaschi is a surname. Notable people with the surname include:

- Arturo Falaschi (1933–2010), Italian geneticist
- Edu Falaschi (born 1972), Brazilian musician
- Francesco Falaschi (born 1961), Italian film director and screenwriter
- Guido Falaschi (1989–2011), Argentine racecar driver
- Marco Falaschi (born 1987), Italian volleyball player
- Nello Falaschi (1913–1986), American football player
- Nermin Vlora Falaschi (1921–2004), Albanian intellectual
- Roberto Falaschi (1931–2009), Italian professional racing cyclist

== See also ==
- Figoni et Falaschi, French coachbuilder
