= 5 Lekë =

Denomination of Albanian currency

- Albania
- Value: 5 Albanian lek
- Mass: 3.120 g
- Diameter: 20 mm
- Thickness: 2 mm
- Edge: Milled
- Composition: Nickel-plated steel
- Years of minting: 1995, 2000, 2011, 2014, 2020, 2023

Obverse
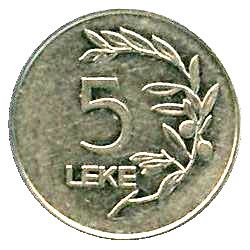
- Design: Value aside branches
- Design date: 1995

Reverse
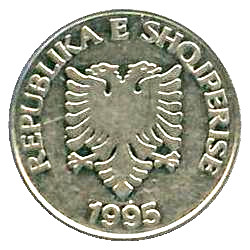
- Design: Eagle from Albanian flag
- Design date: 1995

The 5 Lekë is a coin issued by the Bank of Albania with a value of 5 Albanian lek and is composed of a nickel-covered steel. The coin has been issued in 1995, 2000, 2011, 2014, 2020, and 2023 in nickel-plated steel.

The obverse side features the nominal value beside olive branches. The reverse side features the mint year, REPUBLIKA E SHQIPERISE (transl. Republic of Albania) written near the borders and the eagle from the Albanian flag in the centre.

A silver 5 lek coin struck in Rome was issued during the Italian occupation of Albania in 1939. In 1947 and 1957, the People's Socialist Republic of Albania issued zinc 5 leke coins for circulation.

Several commemorative 5 leke coins have been issued. Between 1968 and 1970, commemorative 5 leke coins were issued for the 500th anniversary of the death of Skanderbeg. In 1987 a commemorative struck in copper-nickel was issued for the 2600th anniversary of the Port of Durrës, featuring a ship with the Durrës Castle on the reverse. Five gold 5 lek Port of Durrës commemoratives were also struck. A later commemorative coin was issued in 1988 to celebrate the 42nd anniversary of the first Albanian railway.

== Gallery ==
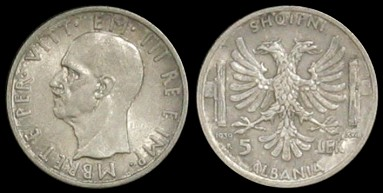
1939 5 leke
