= 10 Lekë =

Albanian circulating coin

- Albania
- Value: 10 Albanian lek
- Mass: 3.6 g
- Diameter: 21.25 mm
- Edge: Milled
- Composition: Aluminum-bronze (1996–2000) Brass-plated steel (2009–2023)
- Years of minting: 1996, 2000, 2009, 2013, 2018, 2023

Obverse
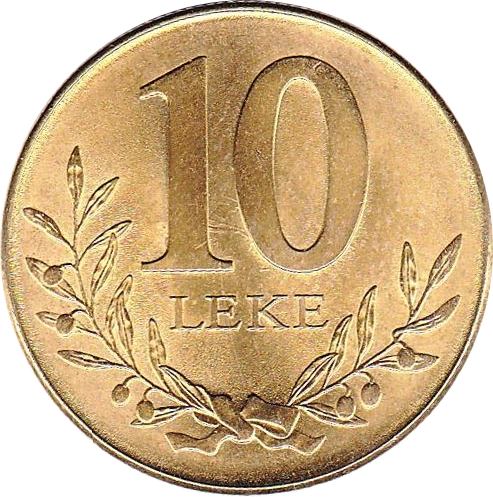
- Design: Value with wreath branches
- Design date: 1996

Reverse
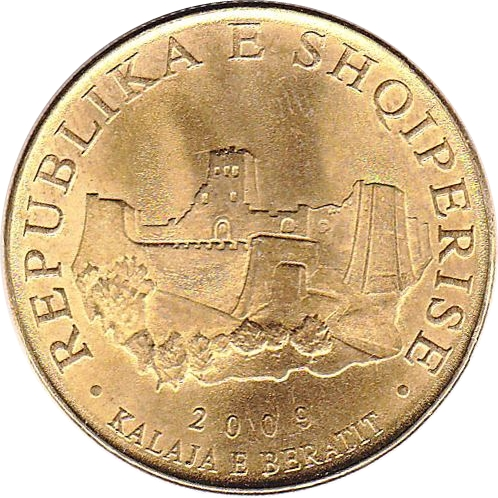
- Design: Berat Castle
- Design date: 1996

The 10 Lekë is a coin issued by the Bank of Albania with the value of 10 Albanian lek. The coin was struck in aluminium bronze in 1996 and 2000, and in brass-plated steel in 2009, 2013, 2018 and 2023. A silver 10 lekë coin was issued under Italian occupation in 1939.

The obverse features the denomination above wreath branches. The reverse features Berat Castle with the inscription REPUBLIKA E SHQIPERISE, which translates to "Republic of Albania".

Several commemorative 10 lekë coins have been issued. A silver 10 lekë coin commemorating the 500th anniversary of the death of Skanderbeg was issued between 1968 and 1970 under the People's Socialist Republic of Albania. During 1991 and 1992 silver 10 lekë coins celebrating the 1992 Summer Olympics were issued. Two commemorative issues were released in 2005, with one issue celebrating Albanian culture and the other commemorating Tirana, the capital of Albania.

== Gallery ==
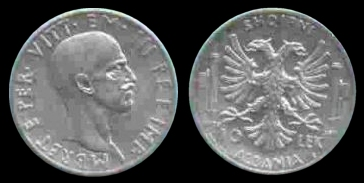
1939 10 lekë

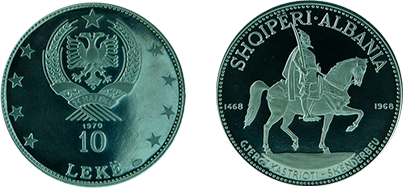
1968 10 lekë
