= Albanian Kingdom (1928–1939) =

Period in Albanian history

Coordinates: 41°N 20°E

Albanian Kingdom Mbretëria Shqiptare (Albanian)
- 1928–1939
- Flag Coat of arms
- Motto: "Atdheu mbi të gjitha" "Homeland above all"
- Anthem: Himni i Flamurit; Hymn to the Flag
- The Albanian Kingdom in 1935
- Capital and largest city: Tirana
- Common languages: Albanian
- Religion: Islam; Eastern Orthodoxy; Roman Catholicism
- Demonym: Albanian
- Government: Constitutional monarchy (de jure); Absolute monarchy (de facto)
- King
  - 1928–1939: Zog I
- Prime Minister
  - 1928–1930: Kostaq Kotta
  - 1930–1935: Pandeli Evangjeli
  - 1935–1936: Mehdi Frashëri
  - 1936–1939: Kostaq Kotta
- Legislature: Constitutional Assembly
- Historical era: Interwar period
  - Established: 1 September 1928
  - Italian invasion: 7 April 1939
  - Government exiled: 9 April 1939
- Currency: Franga
Preceded by	Succeeded by
Albanian Republic	Italian Protectorate

The Albanian Kingdom (Gheg Albanian: Mbretnija Shqiptare; Tosk Albanian: Mbretëria Shqiptare) was the official name of Albania between 1928 and 1939. It was established when the Albanian parliament declared the country a monarchy, and President Ahmet Bej Zogu was proclaimed Zog I. This transition marked the end of the Albanian Republic and the beginning of a constitutional monarchy. Zog I's reign was characterized by efforts to modernize the country, including legal reforms and infrastructure development, although his government maintained his authoritarian practices as president.

The kingdom maintained close relations with Fascist Italy, which provided financial and military support. However, by the late 1930s, Albania's dependence on Italy grew, culminating in Italy's invasion of Albania on April 7, 1939. The invasion led to the establishment of an Italian protectorate, and King Zog I fled into exile. The communist Party of Labor of Albania gained control of the country toward the end of World War II, establishing a communist regime and formally deposing Zog, who lived the remainder of his life in exile.

== Zog's kingdom ==
In 1928, President Zogu secured the parliament's consent to its own dissolution, as he had already gained authoritarian control of the country. A new constituent assembly amended the constitution making Albania a kingdom and transforming Zogu into Zog I, "King of the Albanians". International recognition arrived forthwith. The new constitution abolished the Albanian Senate and created a unicameral Assembly. Although nominally a constitutional monarch, in practice King Zog retained the absolute powers he had held as President Zogu. Civil liberties remained more or less nonexistent, and political opponents were frequently imprisoned and killed. Thus, for all intents and purposes, Albania remained an absolute monarchy.

Soon after his official swearing in as monarch, King Zog broke off his engagement to Shefqet Vërlaci's daughter, and Vërlaci withdrew his support for the King and began plotting against him. Zog had accumulated a great number of enemies over the years, and the Albanian tradition of blood vengeance required them to try to kill him. Zog surrounded himself with guards and rarely appeared in public. The King's loyalists disarmed all of Albania's tribes except for his own Mati tribesmen and their allies, the Dibra. Nevertheless, on a visit to Vienna in 1931, Zog and his bodyguards fought a gun battle with would-be assassins on the Opera House steps (Zog I of Albania § Assassination attempts).

Zog remained sensitive to steadily mounting disillusion with the Kingdom of Italy's domination of Albania. The Royal Albanian Army, though always 15,600 strong, sapped the country's funds, and the Italians' monopoly on training the armed forces rankled public opinion. As a counterweight, Zog kept British officers in the Royal Albanian Gendarmerie despite strong Italian pressure to remove them. In 1931, King Zog openly stood up to the Italians, refusing to renew the 1926 First Treaty of Tirana.

During the crisis of 1929–1933, Zog asked the Italians for a loan of 100 million gold francs in 1931, and the request was approved by the Royal Italian Government. In 1932 and 1933, Albania could not make the interest payments on its loans from the Society for the Economic Development of Albania. In response, Rome turned up the pressure, demanding that Tirana name Italians to direct the Gendarmerie, join Italy in a customs union, grant Italy control of the country's sugar, telegraph, and electrical monopolies, teach the Italian language in all Albanian schools, and admit Italian colonists. Zog refused. Instead, he ordered the national budget slashed by 30 percent, dismissed the Italian military advisers, and nationalised Italian-run Catholic schools in the northern part of the country.

By June 1934, the Kingdom of Albania had signed trade agreements with the Kingdom of Yugoslavia and Greece, and Benito Mussolini had suspended all payments to Tirana. An Italian attempt to intimidate the Albanians by sending a fleet of Regia Marina warships to Albania failed because the Albanians only allowed the forces to land unarmed. Mussolini then attempted to buy off the Albanians. In 1935, he presented the Albanian government with 3 million gold francs as a gift.

Zog's success in defeating two local rebellions convinced Mussolini that the Italians had to reach a new agreement with the Albanian monarch. Relations with Italy were improved in 1936. A government of young men led by Mehdi Frashëri, an enlightened Bektashi administrator, won a commitment from Italy to fulfill financial promises that Mussolini had made to Albania, and to grant new loans for harbour improvements at Durrës and other projects that kept the Royal Albanian Government afloat. Soon Italians began taking positions in Albania's civil service, and Italian settlers were allowed into the country.

== Education ==
Education in the Kingdom of Albania was divided into two levels: primary education and secondary education. According to the Organic Law of Education (June 1928), the purpose of early education was to raise children morally, to develop their spiritual and physical strength and to equip them with knowledge and skills necessary for their private and social life.

Initial education was compulsory and was given free of charge. Primary schools was done over a five-year span and the lessons taught were:

- Moral and civic knowledge.
- Singing and writing.
- Language (Dictation, Drafting and Grammar).
- Arithmetic and geometric elements.
- History of the Albanian Nation and the most important events from General History.
- Geography.
- Elements of natural and physical sciences with applications in agriculture and hygiene.
- Drawing.
- Music.
- Manual work and home economics.
- Gymnastics.
- Practical work of agriculture.

Primary education was compulsory for males and females from the age of 6 to 13. Excluded from the obligation were:

- Those who took lessons at home.
- Those who had contagious diseases.
- The blind, the mute and the deaf (they had to attend special schools).

The state assumed only the expenses of teaching staff of primary schools, the expenses for the maintenance of buildings, furniture and tools as well as those for their maintenance were charged to the municipality, which for this purpose was obliged to allocate in its budget at least 5 percent of its income. Among the primary schools, the following are appointed as teachers:

- Those who had completed a Normal school for teachers.
- Those who had finished a Lyceum and who have a didactic course or after a pedagogical exam.
- In the absence of the above, those who had finished the 4-year gymnasium and other schools equivalent to these can be appointed as assistant teachers, and after serving for four years, they could be appointed as definitive teachers according to an aptitude test.

Secondary education was organized "in the most suitable way to strengthen the will and discipline in the work of the Albanian youth and to awaken the sense of duty towards oneself and towards the Motherland and equip it with a general and national culture."

The types of secondary schools were: gymnasium and lyceum where all subjects were taught in French; Normal commercial institutes, city schools and technical institutes. In secondary schools, lessons were extended: eight years in full gymnasium, nine years in lyceum, of which one is preparation; normally four years; in the commercial institute four years; 4 years in the city and 4 years in the Technical Institute. The normal school of the commercial institute was considered as a high level school, the city school is the lower level and the technical institute high level.

The branches that a city school could have, the division of which begins in the third year, were: trade, woodworking, ironworking, animal husbandry, agriculture and home economics.

The grades used in secondary schools were: 1 (very good); 2 (good); 3 (fairly good): 4 (passable); 5 (bad); 6 (very bad). In the lyceum of Korça, the system of grades was different: 10 was the best grade, 5 was a passing grade, and 0 was the worst grade.

The following lessons were taught in high schools and lyceums:

- Civil and moral knowledge.
- Language and literature.
- Mathematics.
- History.
- Geography.
- Biology.
- Old Greek.
- Latin.
- Elements of philosophy.
- Elements of political economy and law.
- Calligraphy and Drawing.
- Music.
- Gymnastics.

== Economy ==
In 1928, the Basic Statute was adopted, along with a Civil Code and agrarian reform was instituted, removing ferexhesë. The Islamic law was replaced by the Swiss Civil Code, following the model of Mustafa Kemal Atatürk in Turkey. King Zog supported the introduction of modern architecture, and sought to improve welfare, the balance of trade, and the education of Albanian youth. = In 1929, the world was caught by a major crisis caused by overproduction. Its effects were very damaging to Albania. During this year, Zog saw the first signs of the crisis, mainly in the financial and monetary system; they became more sensitive in 1930. The peak of the crisis was between 1934 and 1935. Most industries were paralyzed or went bankrupt. The crisis deeply affected all credit systems. At this time, due to the ongoing budget deficit, and financial difficulties evident in many areas and sectors of the country, loans were taken from Western countries, but the majority were from Italy.

In 1931, Albanian agriculture was affected by a major drought which caused serious consequences in the national food supply. In 1932, as a result of this situation, 33% more wheat and corn was imported.

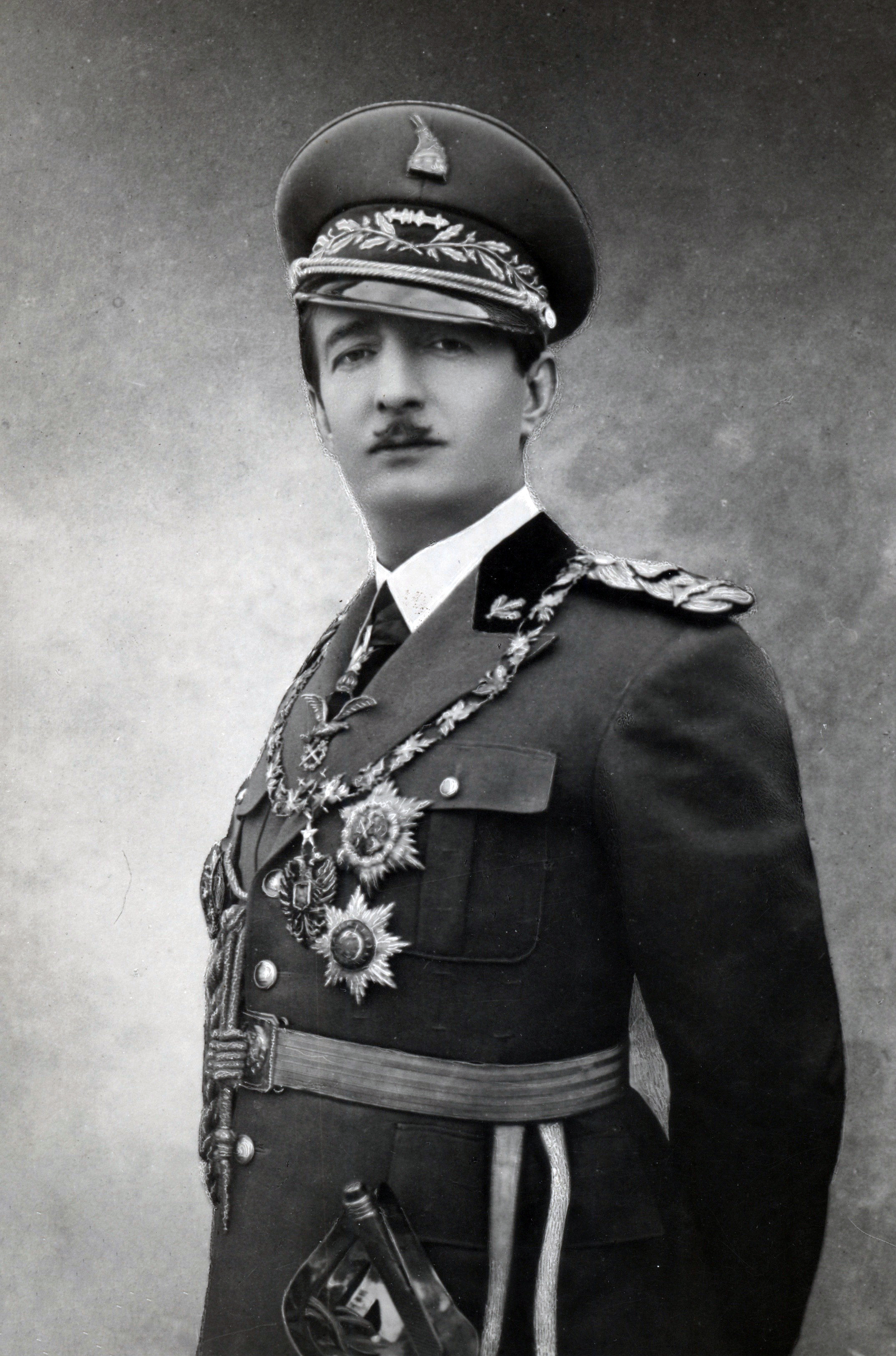
King Zog of Albania

The crisis of 1930–1934 differs in many ways: the percentage of the population living with non-agricultural employment was reduced from 15.9% in 1930 to 15.4% in 1938. Albanian exports grew from 2 million gold francs to 12 million between 1923 and 1931, but fell back to 1923 levels within the next two years. A difficult situation occurred between 1935 and 1936 when the government was forced to distribute emergency food aid in poor areas. Places that sold Albanian goods placed tariffs on imports of cheese and butter. The crisis affected the livestock industry, which accounted for 70% of total national exports. Another significant impact was the establishment of the so-called "tax xhelepit", which applied to head/livestock. In 1933, the state cut the taxes by 50%.

Peasant farmers accounted for the vast majority of the Albanian population. Albania had practically no industry, and the country's potential for hydroelectric power was virtually untapped. Oil was the country's main extractable resource. The Italians took over the oil-drilling concessions of all other foreign companies in 1939 by creating the company "Sveja". A pipeline between the Kuçovë oil field and Vlorë's port expedited shipments of crude petroleum to Italy's refineries. This company dealt with Albania's natural resources. Albania also possessed: bitumen, lignite, iron, chromite, copper, bauxite, manganese, and some gold. Shkodër had a cement factory; Korçë, a brewery; and Durrës and Shkodër, cigarette factories that used locally grown tobacco.

In 1934, the price of the grain reached the lowest level, at about 7.5 gold francs. A strong decline in prices, mainly in the agricultural and livestock industry, affected the monetary and credit policies of the National Commercial Bank. During the years of the crisis, the bank reduced the amount of currency in circulation, which worsened the deflation. The artificially increased value of the franc lowered the prices of products. In mid-1935, Albania entered a recovery phase. Industry recovered, and Zogu created tax incentives, especially for cement factories, which were made exempt from taxes for three years.

Between 1933 and 1935, economic development emerged in the agriculture, livestock and industrial capital industries. Construction of roads and bridges began, along with fifty-three telegraph post links.

During much of the interwar period, Italians held most of the technical jobs in the Albanian economy. Albania had four ports: Durrës, Shëngjin, Vlorë, and Sarandë. Albania's main exports were petroleum, animal skins, cheese, livestock, and eggs. Primary imports were grain and other foodstuffs, metal products, and machinery. In 1939, the value of Albania's imports was four times that of its exports. About seventy percent of Albania's exports went to Italy. Italian factories furnished about forty percent of Albania's imports, and the Italian government paid for the rest.

In 1938 there was a general activation of the national capital in industry. During this period the number of enterprises reached 244, while the number of employees at State administration rose up to 7.435. Industrial production rose, while agriculture declined. In 1938, the total area of agricultural land estimated at 1,163 hectares (2,874 acres), about 39.5% of the occupied state and private property, while smallholders owned 60%.

Cereal production in Albania did not meet its needs. Wheat production was estimated at 38,000 tons, while production of maize was 143,000 tons. After the crisis, the production of industrial crops rose. Tobacco accounted for about 1,100 hectares (2,600 acres). Cereal crops were also grown. Framers planted about 1.2 million roots for cereal crops, 100,000 citrus roots, 41.5 million vineyard roots, and 1.6 million olive trees roots.

During the period between 1936 and 1938 the economy recovered. Trade amounted to 32.7 million gold francs, with 65% growth. Exports grew by 61.5% and imports by 67.3%. Exports in 1938 represented 66.3% of the 1928 level. During the 1936–1938 period the state budget had increased. The Albanian kingdom period was characterized by the growing number of utility works; in 1939 there were thirty-six enterprises in the construction industry.

During this eleven-year period serious efforts were made to create a national road network using an investment of sixty million gold francs borrowed from the Italian Kingdom. During the ten-year period between 1929 and 1939 850 km of main roads, 456 km of secondary roads, 4,062 small bridges 10,250 miles long, and seventy-six major bridges 2,050 miles in length were constructed. This period also introduced the construction of a sewage network, and, for the first time, money was invested to build segments of roads in the northern part of Albania. The most important roads were: Shkodër-Puka, Mat-Bishop Bridge, Krujë-Mat, Tirana-Elbasan, Lushnjë-Mbrostar, Korçë-Burrel, Burrel-Dibër, Tiranë-Shijak-Durrës, Tiranë-Ndroq-Durrës, and Tiranë-Krrabë-Elbasan. Engineers from Europe were employed to complete these projects. In 1938, the value of investments reached 150 million Albanian Lek (1961 currency prices). On the eve of the fascist invasion, Albania had 300 trucks, 20 buses, and 200 cars and pickups.

During 1938, 95,000 tons of cargo were transported, equal to 1 million tons per kilometer. During the same period, the total turnover of goods in retail trade amounted to 3,900 million in 1947 prices. On 28 November 1938, Radio Tirana, the national radio station began broadcasting. Construction of the port of Durrës began. The construction of brace works, irrigation canals, etc., was interrupted by the beginning of World War II (1939–1945).

=== Military ===
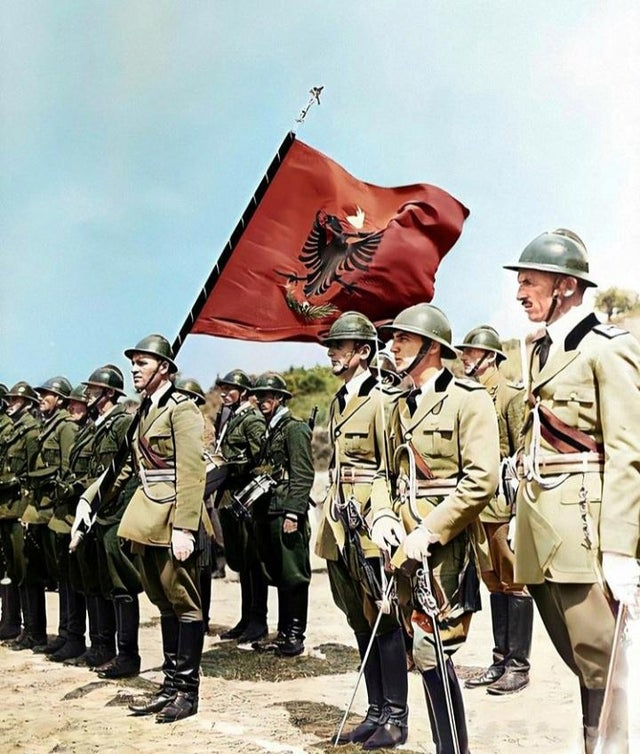
Honor guard of the Royal Albanian Army around 1939.

The Royal Albanian Army was the army of the Kingdom of Albania and King Zogu from 1928 until 1939. Its commander-in-chief was King Zog; its commander was General Xhemal Aranitasi; its chief of staff was General Gustav von Myrdacz. The army was financed mainly by Italy during period between 1936 and 1939. The army had 15,600 deployed personnel and 29,860 reserve personnel.

== Social conditions ==
Poor and remote, Albania remained decades behind the other Balkan countries in educational and social development. Only some 13% of the population lived in towns. Illiteracy plagued almost the entire population. About 90% of the country's peasants practiced subsistence agriculture, using ancient methods and tools, such as wooden plows. Much of the country's richest farmland lay under water in malaria-infested coastal marshlands. Albania lacked a banking system, a railroad, a modern port, an efficient military, a university, or a modern printing press. The Albanians had Europe's highest birthrate and infant mortality rate, and life expectancy for men was about thirty-eight years.

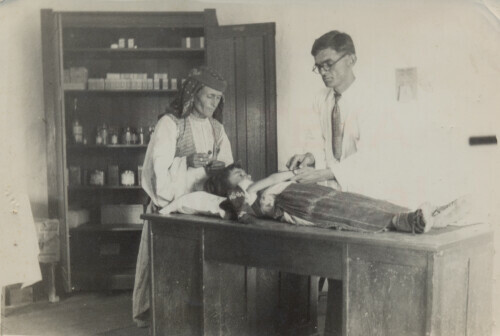
Vaccination of children in Durrës.

The American Red Cross opened schools and hospitals at Durrës and Tirana, and one Red Cross worker founded an Albanian chapter of the Boy Scouts that all boys between twelve and eighteen years old were subsequently required to join by law. Although hundreds of schools opened across the country, in 1938 only 36% of all Albanian children of school age were receiving education of any kind.

During the reign of Zog primary education became necessary. Despite meager educational opportunities, literature flourished in Albania between the two world wars. Substantial progress had been achieved in literature, and art publishing operations. Distinguished writers included: Fan Stilian Noli, Alexander Drenova, Esad Mekuli, Ndre Mjeda, Haki Stermilli, Lasgush Poradeci, Faik Konica, Sterjo Spasse, Ndoc Nikaj, Foqion Postoli, Migjeni and others. A Franciscan priest and poet, Gjergj Fishta, dominated the literary scene with his poems about the Albanians' perseverance during their quest for freedom. During this period 600 night schools were opened in an attempt to eradicate illiteracy, but in 1939 80% of the adult population was still illiterate.

In 1939 Albania had 643 primary schools and 18 high schools. The most important high schools were: Pedagogical school of Elbasan, Lyceum of Korçë, Shkodër Gymnasium, and the Trade school of Vlorë with an enrollment of 5,700 pupils. Those who wanted to continue their education often went abroad to Italy, Austria, France etc... In 1939 about 420 Albanians were studying abroad. Among the literate population 446 people had a university degree and 1,773 had secondary schooling.

Daily newspapers started publishing, including: Demokracia, Liria Kombëtare, Besa, Hylli i Dritës, and Leka along with a large number of pedagogical and scientific publications. Organizations such as Gruaja Shqiptare attempted to modernize Albanian society and in 1938 the first national Radio station went on-air. These were the first steps toward modernization of the country, but Albania remained Europe's most underdeveloped nation in many respects.

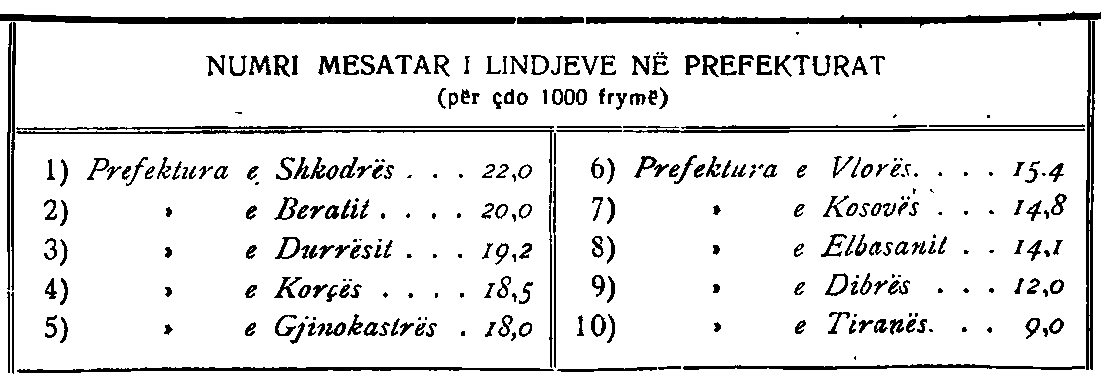
Average number of births in the prefectures (for every 1000 people) in 1927

The lack of economic development prompted several strikes. In 1936, Albanian workers working for foreign companies in the Kuçovë oil field held a strike that was organized by Puna. Another was held in Vlorë and in February 1936 a strike was held by workers and craftsmen in Korçë which grew into a demonstration that was known as the "Hunger Strike". Migjeni's works describe the poverty and the social situation of that period. In 1929 a communist society was established but was not supported by Orthodox, Catholic or the Islamic because of its atheistic ideology.

== Religion ==
Originally, under the monarchy, religious institutions were put under state control. In 1923, the Albanian Muslim congress convened at Tirana and decided to break with the Caliphate establishing a new form of prayer (standing, instead of the traditional salah ritual), banishing polygamy, and doing away with the mandatory use of veil (hijab) by women in public, which had been forced on the urban population by the Ottomans during the occupation.

In 1929 the Albanian Orthodox Church was declared autocephalous (self-headed).

A year later, in 1930, the first official religious census was carried out. Reiterating conventional Ottoman data from a century earlier which previously covered double the new state's territory and population, 50% of the population was grouped as Sunni Muslim, 20% as Orthodox Christian, 20% as Bektashi Muslim, and 10% as Catholic Christian.

The monarchy was determined that religion should no longer be a foreign-oriented master dividing Albanians, but a nationalized servant uniting them. It was at this time that newspaper editorials began to disparage the almost universal adoption of Muslim and Christian names, suggesting instead that children be given neutral Albanian names.

Official slogans began to appear everywhere. "Religion separates, patriotism unites." "We are no longer Muslim, Orthodox, Catholic, we are all Albanians." "Our religion is Albanism." The national hymn characterized neither Muhammad nor Jesus Christ, but King Zogu as "Shpëtimtari i Atdheut" (Savior of the Fatherland). The hymn to the flag honored the soldier dying for his country as a "Saint". Increasingly the mosque and the church were expected to function as servants of the state, the patriotic clergy of all faiths preaching the gospel of Albanism.

Monarchy stipulated that the state should be neutral, with no official religion and that the free exercise of religion should be extended to all faiths. Neither in government nor in the school system should favor be shown to any one faith over another. Albanism was substituted for religion, and officials and schoolteachers were called "apostles" and "missionaries." Albania's sacred symbols were no longer the cross and the crescent, but the Flag and the King. Hymns idealizing the nation, Skanderbeg, war heroes, the king and the flag predominated in public-school music classes to the exclusion of virtually every other theme.

The first reading lesson in elementary schools introduced a patriotic catechism beginning with this sentence, "I am an Albanian. My country is Albania." Then there follows in poetic form, "But man himself, what does he love in life?" "He loves his country." "Where does he live with hope? Where does he want to die?" "In his country." "Where may he be happy, and live with honor?" "In Albania."

== Italian occupation ==
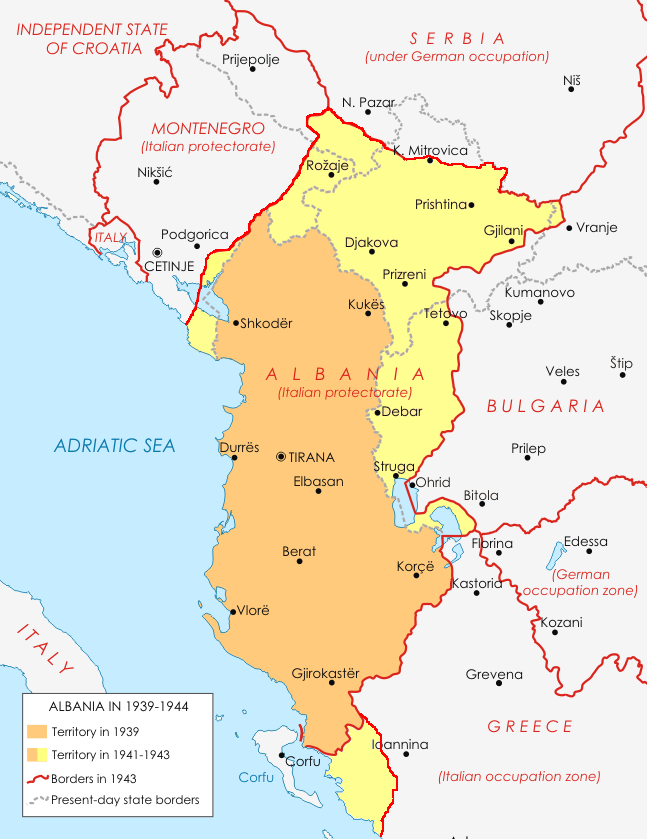
Map of "Greater Albania", under Italian control in 1941-1943

As Germany annexed Austria and moved against Czechoslovakia, Italy saw itself becoming a second-rate member of the Axis. The imminent birth of an Albanian royal child meanwhile threatened to give Zog a lasting dynasty. After Hitler invaded Czechoslovakia (March 15, 1939) without notifying Mussolini in advance, the Italian dictator decided to proceed with his own annexation of Albania. Italy's King Victor Emmanuel III criticized the plan to take Albania as an unnecessary risk.

Rome, however, delivered Tirana an ultimatum on March 25, 1939, demanding that it accede to Italy's occupation of Albania. Zog refused to accept money in exchange for countenancing a full Italian takeover and colonization of Albania, and on April 7, 1939, Mussolini's troops invaded Albania. Despite some stubborn resistance, especially at Durrës, the Italians made short work of the Albanians.

Unwilling to become an Italian puppet, King Zog, his wife, Queen Geraldine Apponyi, and their infant son Leka fled to Greece and eventually to London. On April 12, the Albanian parliament voted to unite the country with Italy. Victor Emmanuel III took the Albanian crown, and the Italians set up a fascist government under Shefqet Verlaci and soon absorbed Albania's military and diplomatic service into Italy's.

Extent of the Greek Advance into southern Albania

After the German army defeated Poland, Denmark, and France, Mussolini decided to use Albania as a springboard to invade Greece. After months of escalation, Italians launched their invasion on October 28, 1940. Hitler learned of the invasion that day, en-route to Florence to meet his Italian counterpart. Hitler wished Mussolini the best of luck and refrained from expressing any disapproval, though after the meeting he raged and told his inner circle that what Mussolini had done was "pure madness". Mussolini counted on a quick victory, but the Greek military halted the Italian army and soon advanced into southern Albania. The Greek army maintained a slow advance from mid-November 1940 until mid-February 1941, when Italian reinforcements for the upcoming Italian spring offensive stabilized the lines. The failure of the Italian spring offensive in March left the Greeks in control of Albanian territory between Himarë and Pogradec. In April 1941, Germany and its allies invaded and occupied both Greece and Yugoslavia, pushing Greece out of Albania and occupying areas of Yugoslavia with ethnic Albanians. A month later, the Axis transferred control of Kosovo to Albania, enlarging it to its greatest territorial extent.

== Legacy ==
Zog, King of the Albanians was still the legitimate monarch of the country, but he would not get the throne back. The communist partisans during and after the war, backed by Yugoslavia and the Soviet Union, suppressed the Albanian nationalist movements and installed a Stalinist regime that would last for about 46 years. King Zog was banned from entering Albania by the communists and lived in exile for the rest of his life.

== See also ==
- 10 Vjet Mbretni, Albanian encyclopedic guide book
- Albanian Royal Army
- Leka, Crown Prince of Albania

== Bibliography ==
- Patrice Najbor, Histoire de l'Albanie et de sa maison royale (5 volumes), JePublie, Paris, 2008, (ISBN 978-2-9532382-0-4).
- Patrice Najbor, La dynastye des Zogu, Textes & Prétextes, Paris, 2002
