= 10 Vjet Mbretni =

1938 Albanian encyclopedic guide book

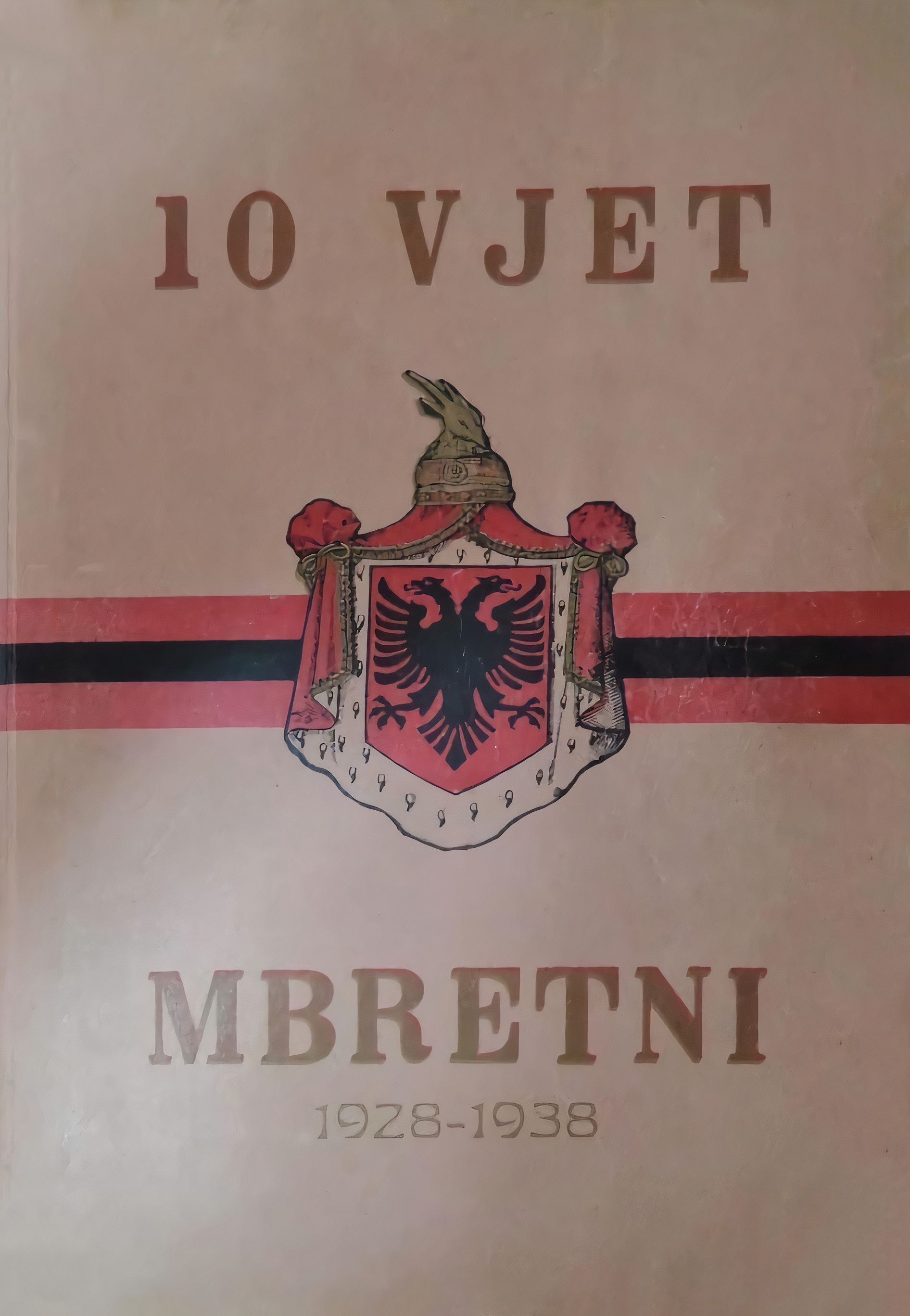
- Book cover
- Author: Zoi Xoxa
- Language: Albanian
- Genre: Guide book
- Published: 1938
- Publisher: Ministry of Internal Affairs
- Publication place: Albanian Kingdom
- Pages: 344

10 Vjet Mbretni (English: "10 Years Reign") is a 1938 Albanian encyclopedic guide book authored by Zoi Xoxa that features aspects of daily life in the Albanian Kingdom.

== Overview ==
The book mainly focuses on the political and economic developments taking place in the Kingdom during its first 10 years of existence. Fragments in the book reflect the first meetings and decisions of the Constituent Assembly of 1928 and lists the laws adopted in this time.

Other details in the book paint a flattering and somewhat exaggerating picture of King Zog's family origin and his youth. It mentions the Zogolli family tracing its roots all the way to Skanderbeg. The book further makes the assessment that Zog's exile in Vienna was a result of his characterization as a harmful element of Austro-Hungarian policy in Albania during the First World War.

Numerous illustrations and previously unpublished photographs in the book highlight the lives of Queen Geraldine and the princesses of the royal court.

The book was published by the Ministry of Internal Affairs. It contains 344 pages and originally cost 10 gold francs.
