= Banka Kombëtare Tregtare =

Albanian bank

Banka Kombëtare Tregtare (BKT)
- Type: Shareholder Company (SHA)
- Industry: Banking
- Founded: 1993 (the merge of BTSH & BKSH)
- Headquarters: Tirana, Albania; Pristina, Kosovo
- Key people: Seyhan Penacablıgil (CEO) Mehmet Usta (Chairman) Mehmet Ertuğrul Gürler (Vice-Chairman)
- Products: Banking services
- Parent: Çalık Holding
- Website: www.bkt.com.al

Banka Kombëtare Tregtare (BKT) is the largest and oldest operating commercial bank in Albania, tracing its roots to the creation of the National Bank of Albania in 1925. In 2021, it had a market share of 26.11%.

== Establishment ==
In the early 1990s, Albania reformed its banking system to establish a two-tier banking system. In 1991, Banka Tregtare Shqiptare (BTSH) was established from the sub-division of the activities of the Albanian State Bank, the main activity of which was managing the foreign trade operations of the state-owned entities with former socialist countries. In 1992, Banka Kombëtare e Shqipërisë (BKSH) was created by a second sub-division of the State Bank of Albania. BKSH was set up to manage the domestic trading activity of the State-owned entities. The assets and liabilities from the activities of these two entities were transferred to BKT accounts since it was first established.

Banka Kombëtare Tregtare (BKT) was established in January 1993 by merging BTSH and BKSH. It was subsequently restructured as a joint-stock company in July 1997, with assets reaching ALL 2.7 billion.

== Privatization ==
The bank accomplished its privatization process in the year 2000. Particularly on 6 July 2000, The Albanian Parliament approved the sale contract between the Ministry of Finance and the Consortium of International Investors consisting of Kentbank with 60% of the shares, International Finance Corporation (IFC) with 20%, and European Bank for Reconstruction and Development with 20%. The transfer of ownership entered into force on 17 October 2000. By November of the same year, the new shareholders invested US$10 million, recapitalizing the bank.

In 2001 restructured all aspects of the bank's operations from personnel and procedures to IT infrastructure.

2006 started with a new vision for Banka Kombëtare Tregtare. With the authorization of the Bank of Albania and pursuant to the specific court decision issued on 9 June 2006, the transfer of 60% plus 2 of the bank's shares possessed by Kent Bank was approved in favour of Çalik-Seker Konsorsiyum Yatirim A.S. Eventually after the decision to expand in Kosovo in September 2007, the institution already had 24 branches opened, ranking the largest Albanian bank in the region.

On 30 June 2009, Çalik Financial Services bought the shares of the IFC and EBRD, and thus became the bank's sole shareholder.
