= Albanian Republic (1925–1928) =

Republic in Europe between 1925 and 1928

Coordinates: 41°N 20°E

Albanian Republic Republika Shqiptare (Albanian)
- 1925–1928
- Flag Arms of State
- Motto: "Atdheu mbi të gjitha" "Homeland above all"
- Anthem: Himni i Flamurit; Hymn to the Flag
- Capital: Tirana
- Common languages: Albanian
- Religion: Sunni Islam, Bektashism, Christianity (Eastern Orthodoxy, Roman Catholicism)
- Demonym: Albanian
- Government: Parliamentary republic under a military dictatorship
- President
  - 1925–1928: Ahmet Zogu
- Prime Minister
  - 1925–1928: Ahmet Zogu
- Legislature: Parliament
  - Upper Chamber: Senate
  - Lower Chamber: Chamber of Deputies
- Historical era: Interwar period
  - Constitution adopted: 31 January 1925
  - Monarchy proclaimed: 1 September 1928
- Currency: Albanian Franga
| Preceded by | Succeeded by |
| Principality of Albania | Albanian Kingdom |
- Today part of: Albania

The Albanian Republic (Albanian: Republika Shqiptare) was the official name of Albania as enshrined in the Constitution of 1925. Albania came into an alliance with the Kingdom of Italy after signing the Treaties of Tirana, which gave Italy a monopoly on shipping and trade concessions. Albania was declared a constitutional monarchy in 1928. Upon its inception, Italy demanded to be allies with the republic. This was done largely to increase Italy's influence in the Balkans, and to aid Italian and Albanian security in their territorial feuds with the Second Hellenic Republic and the Kingdom of Serbs, Croats, and Slovenes.

== History ==
After defeating Fan Noli's government, Ahmet Zogu recalled parliament in order to find a solution for the uncrowned Principality of Albania, which had been de facto lacking a head of State ever since Prince Wilhelm had departed the country in 1914. The Parliament quickly adopted a new constitution that named Albania as a parliamentary republic, with a president serving as head of state and government. The president was vested with sweeping powers. He could appoint and dismiss ministers, veto legislation, name all major administrative personnel, and choose a third of the Senate's members. For all intents and purposes, the constitution made Zogu's regime a legal dictatorship.

On January 31, 1925, Zogu was elected president for a term of seven years by the National Assembly, prior to his proclamation as King of Albanians. He ruled Albania using four military governors and appointed clan chieftains as reserve army officers who were kept on call to protect the regime against domestic or foreign threats. He also maintained good relations with Benito Mussolini's fascist regime in Italy and supported Italy's foreign policy.

In early 1925, a series of reforms focused on the economy were initiated, but results were mixed. Some of the reforms included organizing private initiatives in industry, construction, and transportation. That same year, the first Albanian coin, the Albanian Gold Franga, was minted. Foreign capital was introduced as a part of the official policy of the government, but the aim of Zogu's regime was actually to strengthen personal power, and to enrich his supporters. The foreign capital, loans and other forms, was used as a tool to provide income for the regime and was later used for overcoming economic crises.

The reforms came at the price of personal freedom. Zogu's regime was a police state. He all but eliminated civil liberties and subjected the press to strict censorship. Political opponents were jailed and often killed.

Fourteen new societies were created at about this time, with an initial capital of 7.6 million gold francs, about 28% more than the capital of the societies in the period 1921–1924. In 1928, the number of enterprises reached 127, and domestic capital was six times greater than in 1927, while the economy began to stabilise.

In 1925, the National Bank of Albania was created and was awarded concessions to Italian investors. Albanian investors were initially expected to hold a 49% share of the bank's capital, while Italians were to control a 51% share; furthermore, Albanian investors soon sold their shares, mostly to Italian buyers. More generally, Italy gained a stronger position in Albania. During the 1925–1928 period, the Albanian government also significantly increased its costs.

In 1925, the SVEA society (Society for the Economic Development of Albania) was established, helping to facilitate a loan to Albania worth 50 million gold francs. In 1927, the loan was estimated at 65 million gold francs. Annual interest for this 40-year loan was 7.5%. Repayment amounts consisted of 30%-40% of the entire country's income.

In 1925, agreements between Albanian financial agencies (such as SVEA) and Italian financial groups, financed 96.4% of the road building projects in Albania. These loans were not exclusively for the country's immediate economic needs, but to create conditions for further penetration of foreign capital into the country. Government departmental responsibilities were also shuffled to increase road-building.

In 1928, fiefdoms occupied an area of 200,000 hectares (100,000 were private fiefdoms). Berat was the city with the largest number of fiefdoms, with about 36,000.

Infrastructure was poorly maintained during this period. Roads could only carry lighter vehicles, while poorly maintained bridges hampered car transport. Maritime transport was primarily conducted by foreign companies. Mail air transport was operated by Italians. Trade was the largest element of the economy, and during this time the circulation of goods grew. Raw materials and livestock were the main exports.

Many Italian, English, French, and American companies began to do business in the Albanian market, and they were helped by trade agreements or through direct investment.

Italy's position was further strengthened by the Maritime Trade Treaty, which gave the state the status of "most favored nation". This legalized the Italian monopoly on foreign trade.

=== Italian penetration ===
In return for aiding Zogu's invasion, Belgrade expected repayment in the form of territory and influence in Tirana. Although Zogu promised Belgrade frontier concessions before the invasion, the Albanian leader continued to press Albania's own territorial claims. On July 30, 1925, the two nations signed an agreement returning the Monastery of Saint Naum on Lake Ohrid, and other disputed borderlands, to the Yugoslavia. Yugoslavia, however, never reaped the dividends it hoped for when it invested in Zogu. He shunned Belgrade and turned Albania toward Italy for protection.

Italian advocates of territorial expansion in Albania gained strength in October 1922 when Benito Mussolini took power in Rome. His fascist supporters undertook an unabashed program aimed at establishing a new Roman empire in the Mediterranean region that would rival Britain and France. Mussolini saw Albania as a foothold in the Balkans, and after the war the Great Powers effectively recognized an Italian protectorate over Albania.

In May 1925, Italy began a penetration into Albania's national life that would culminate fourteen years later in its occupation and annexation of Albania. The first major step in this process was an agreement between Rome and Tirana that allowed Italy to exploit Albania's mineral resources. Soon, Albania's parliament agreed to allow Italian interests to control the National Bank of Albania, which acted as the Albanian treasury's fiscal agent even though its main office was in Rome, and Italian banks effectively controlled it. The Albanians also awarded Italian shipping companies a monopoly on freight and passenger transport to and from Albania.

In late 1925, the Italian-backed Society for the Economic Development of Albania began to lend the Albanian government funds at high-interest rates for transportation, agriculture, and public-works projects, including Zogu's palace. In the end, the loans turned out to be subsidies.

In mid-1926, Italy set out to extend its political influence in Albania, asking Tirana to recognize Rome's special interest in Albania and accept Italian instructors in the army and police. Zogu resisted until an uprising in the northern mountains pressured the Albanian leader to conclude the First Treaty of Tirana with the Italians on November 27, 1926. In the treaty, both states agreed not to conclude any agreements with any other states prejudicial to their mutual interests. The agreement, in effect, guaranteed Zogu's political position in Albania, as well as the country's territorial integrity.

In November 1927, Albania and Italy entered into a defensive alliance, the Second Treaty of Tirana, which brought an Italian general and about forty officers to train the Albanian army. Italian military experts soon began instructing paramilitary youth groups. Tirana also allowed the Italian navy access to the port of Vlorë, and the Albanians received large deliveries of armaments from Italy.

=== Transition to monarchy ===
In 1928, President Zogu secured the parliament's consent to its own dissolution. A new constituent assembly amended the constitution making Albania a kingdom and transforming Zogu into Zog I, "King of the Albanians". International recognition arrived forthwith. The new constitution abolished the Albanian Senate and created a unicameral Assembly. Although nominally a constitutional monarch, in practice King Zog retained the dictatorial powers he had held as President Zogu. Civil liberties remained more or less nonexistent, and political opponents were frequently imprisoned and killed. Thus, for all intents and purposes, Albania remained a military dictatorship or, more properly, an absolute monarchy.

== See also ==
- Albania
- Albanian Kingdom (1928–1939)
- Zog I of Albania
