= Bank of Albania =

Monetary authority of Albania

Bank of Albania Banka e Shqipërisë

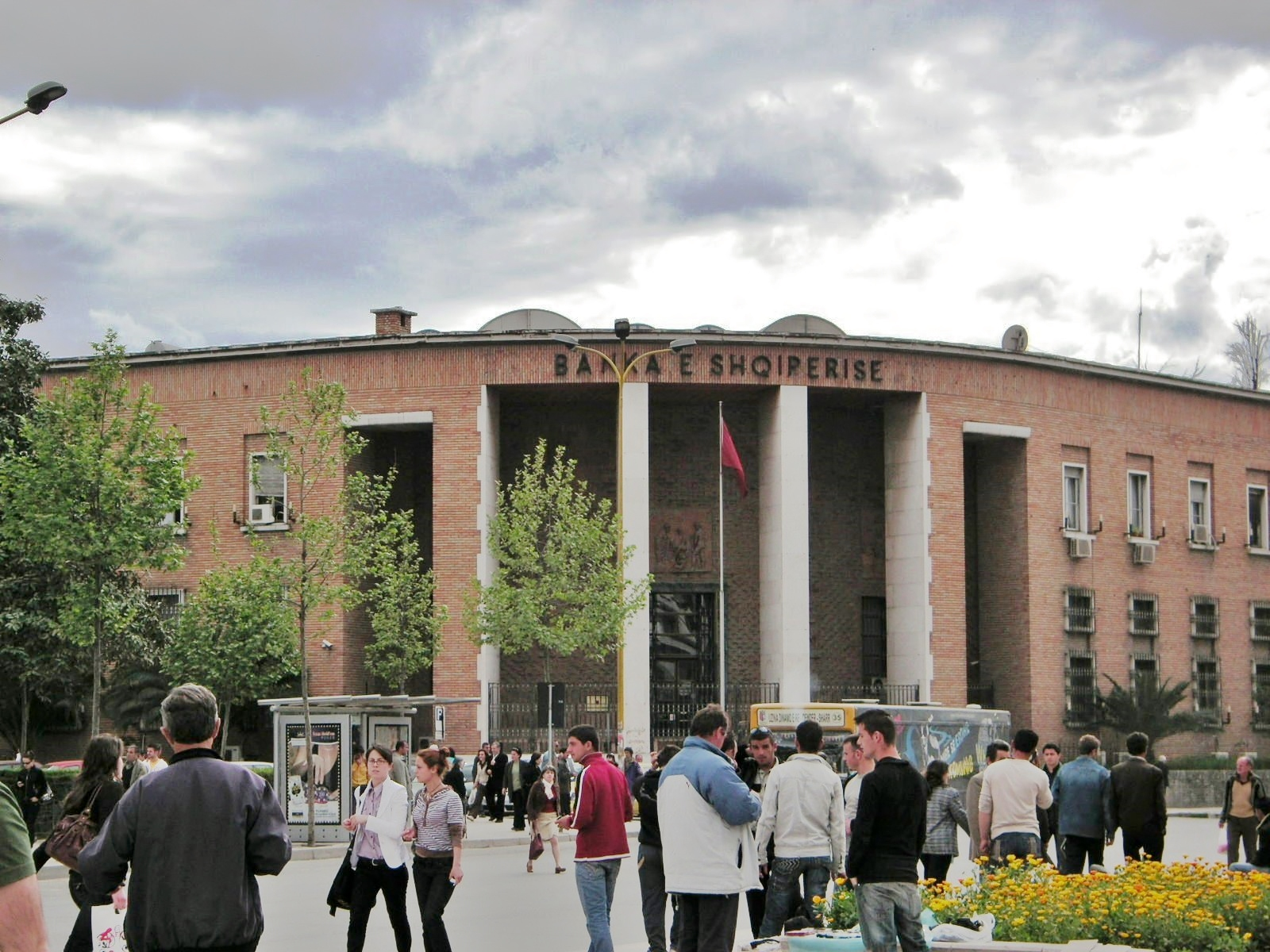
- Head office on Skanderbeg Square, Tirana
- Central bank of: Albania
- Headquarters: Sheshi Austria 1, 1001 Tirana, Albania
- Established: 2 September 1925
- Ownership: 100% state ownership
- Governor: Gent Sejko
- Currency: Albanian Lek; ALL (ISO 4217)
- Reserves: €7.3 billion (January 2026)
- Website: www.bankofalbania.org

The Bank of Albania (Albanian: Banka e Shqipërisë) is the central bank of Albania, issuing the Albanian lek. It is headquartered in Tirana, with five branches in Shkodër, Elbasan, Gjirokastër, Korçë and Lushnjë, and a Research and Training Center in Berat.

The bank was founded in 1925 in Rome as the National Bank of Albania (Albanian: Banka Kombëtare e Shqipnis, Italian: Banca Nazionale d’Albania, Albanian acronym BKS or BKSH), replaced in 1945 by the state-owned Albanian State Bank based in Tirana (Albanian: Banka e Shtetit Shqiptar, BSS or BSHSH), before adopting its current name in 1992.

== History ==
=== Background ===
In the first few years following Albania's declaration of independence on 28 November 1912, the fledgling country lacked a central bank, and several attempts to create one were unsuccessful.

Under Ismail Qemali's leadership, a first "National Bank of Albania" was created on 4 October 1913, whose construct was dominated by foreign banks such as the Austrian Wiener Bankverein and the Banca Commerciale Italiana. The backlash against that foreign domination triggered a revolt in mid-May 1914 against the regime nominally led by Wilhelm von Wied and practically by strongman Essad Toptani. The bank venture was terminated after only a few months.

Monetary chaos ensued during World War I, when Albania was occupied by various foreign powers. In the early 1920s, foreign currency was used for all transactions, generating considerable dysfunction. In 1923, Albanian municipalities were allowed to issue their own banknotes. One project floated by the Economic and Financial Organization of the League of Nations envisaged a central bank for Albania as a cooperative venture co-sponsored by various European governments, with Albania itself owning only 10 percent of its share capital.

=== National Bank ===
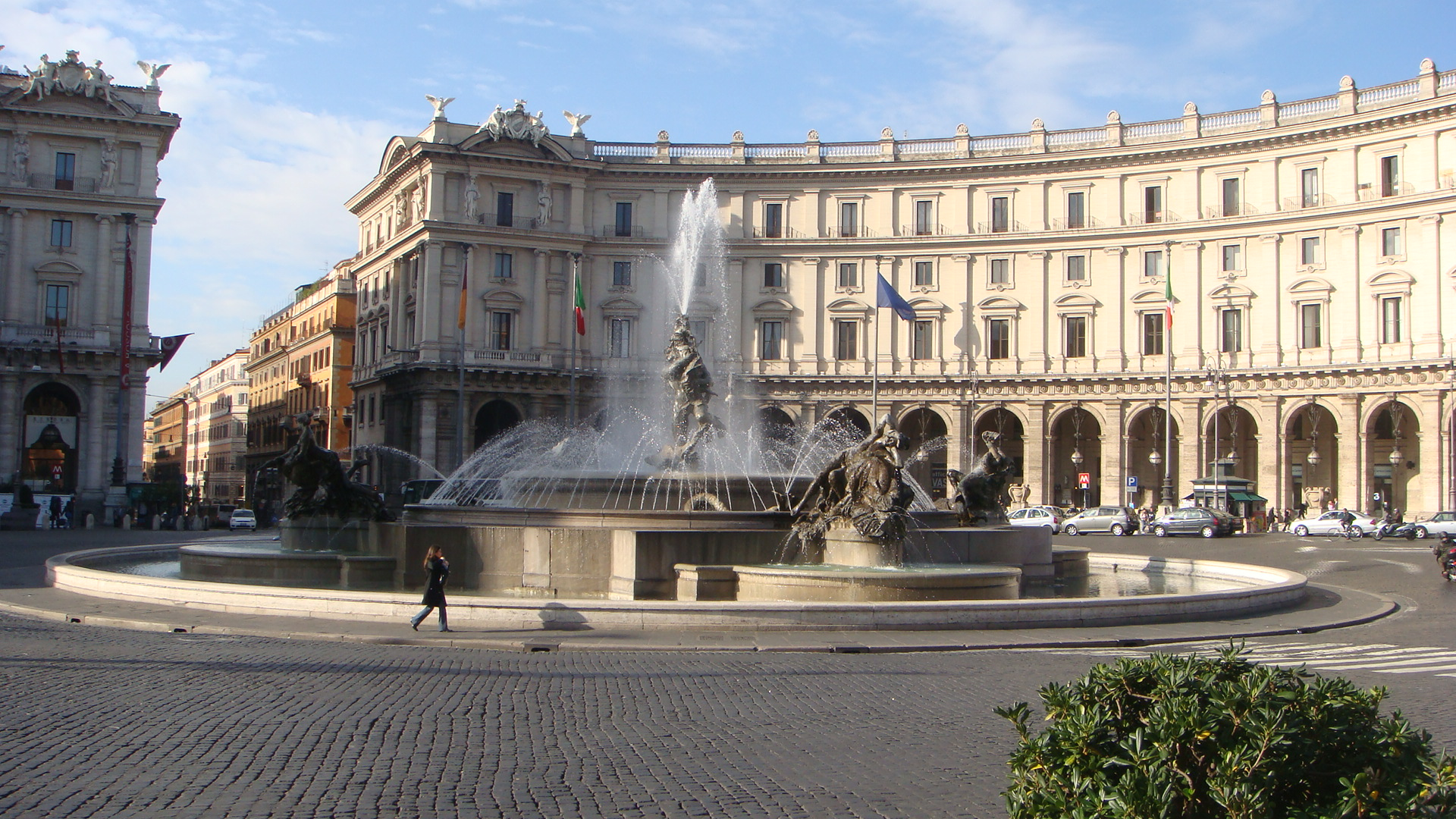
Former seat of the National Bank of Albania on Piazza della Repubblica, Rome (formerly Piazza dell'Esedra)

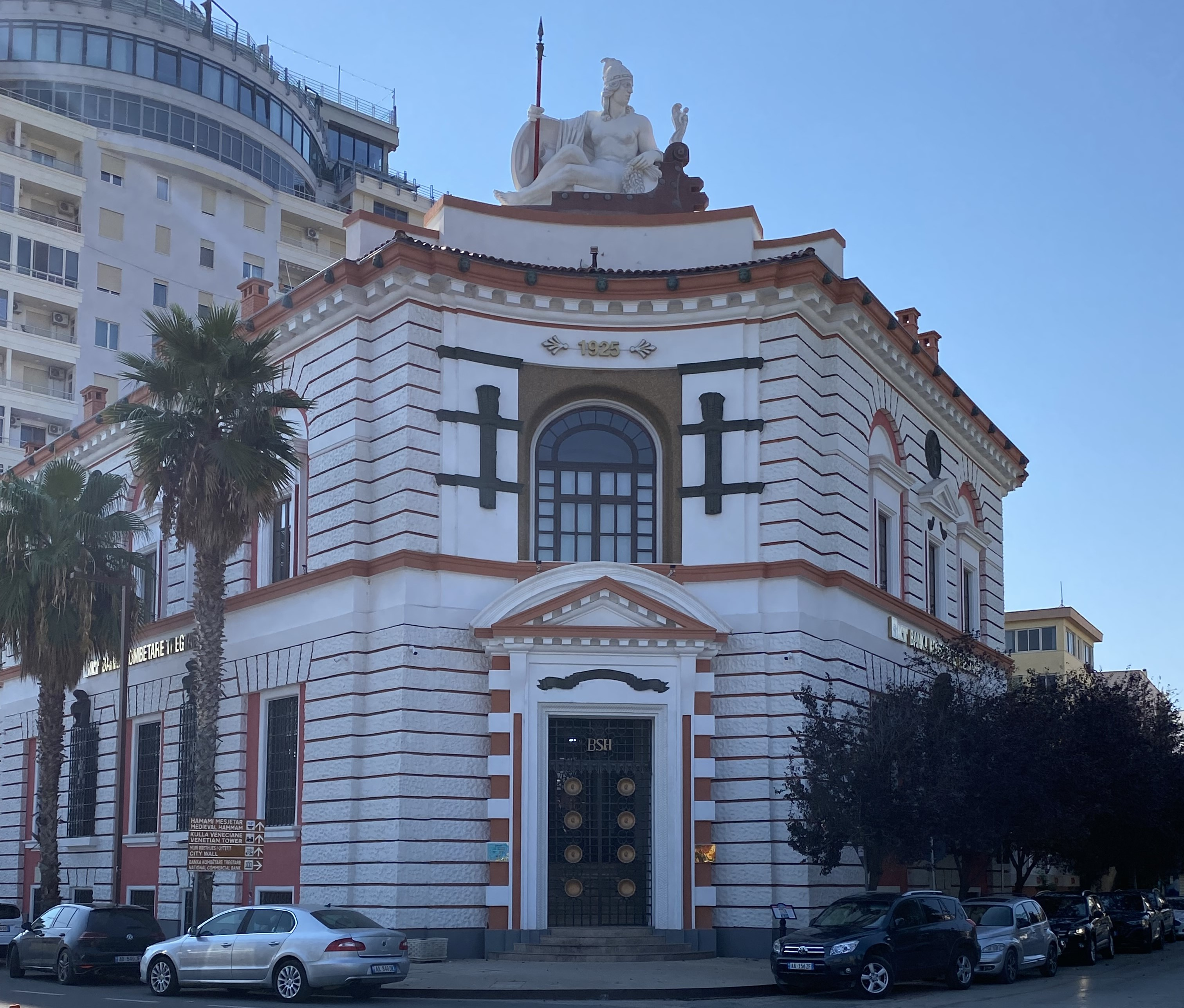
Former Durrës office, inaugurated in 1928 and the center of the bank's Albanian operations until 1938; the date 1925 on the facade refers to the founding of the bank and Durrës branch

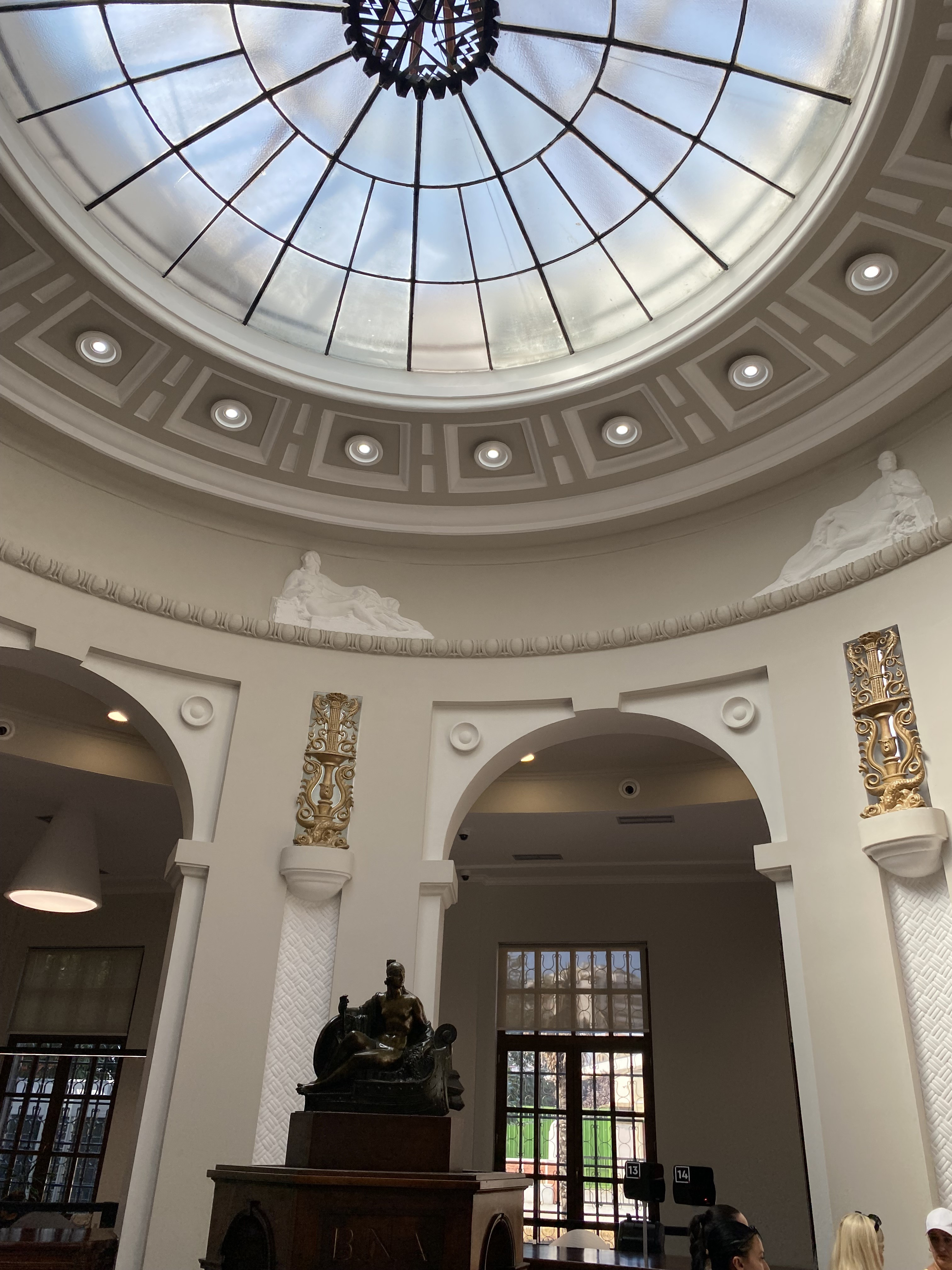
Interior hall of the Durrës building, lately a branch of Banka Kombëtare Tregtare

With the proclamation of the Albanian Republic and consolidation of power by strongman Ahmed Zogu, conditions appeared that enabled the creation of a more stable financial infrastructure, albeit at the price of severe dependence on external powers. With involvement of British and especially Italian diplomats, a convention was signed on 15 March 1925 between the Albanian authorities represented by Foreign Minister Mufid Libohova and the Italian bank Credito Italiano led by Mario Alberti, setting the framework for the creation of the National Bank of Albania, with seat in Rome and operations in Albania. The text was then ratified by the Albanian legislature on 22 June 1925, allowing the National Bank of Albania to be formally established in Rome on 2 September 1925.

The convention of March 1925 had established that the National Bank's initial share capital would be held by a mix of Italian, Albanian, Yugoslav, Swiss and Belgian partners. The stated intent was that Albanian interests would control half of the capital of 12.5 million gold francs, but they turned out to not have the capacity or willingness for that. As a result, Italian interests ended up holding more than half of the total. Specifically, the bank was founded with 100,000 founders' shares, entirely in Italian hands and largely controlled by Credito Italiano, and 495,000 common shares dispersed among various investors. These included Eqrem Vlora (11.7 percent), Nexhat Pasha Vlora (10.5 percent), Basler Handelsbank (10.1 percent), a Yugoslav consortium of Belgrade Cooperative Bank, Serbian Bank in Zagreb, Adriatic-Danubian Bank and Serbo-Albanian Bank (10.1 percent), Mufid's brother Ajet Libohova and Ugo Viali (8.1 percent each), Banca Commerciale Italiana, Banca Nazionale di Credito, Banco di Roma, and Massimo Aurelio (6.1 percent each), Vincenzo Azzolini and Banque Belge pour l'Étranger (5 percent each), with the remaining 35,000 shares (7.1 percent) mostly held by smaller Italian banks.

In practice and despite its name, the National Bank of Albania was entirely outside the control of the Albanian authorities, and has been described as a "real death-knell for any further Albanian economic independence". It was legally headquartered in Rome and led by an Italian official, initially the economist Amedeo Gambino. This setup was inspired by the precedent of the State Bank of Morocco, whose central functions were split between Paris and Tangier. Similarly, the National Bank's founding meeting and subsequent meetings of its governing body (consiglio di amministrazione) were held in Rome, where the Albanian government's gold reserves were transferred. The political backlash against the foreign dominance of the National Bank was leveraged by Zogu to sideline Mufid Libohova, an able official whom he had come to view as a potential rival and who was forced to retire from Albanian political life.

The National Bank's Roman seat was on Piazza dell'Esedra, at the corner with the Via Nazionale and thus not far from the Bank of Italy. In Albania, its offices opened in Durrës on 29 November 1925, in Shkodër on 1 November 1926, in Vlorë on 15 November 1926, and subsequently in Berat, Elbasan, Korçë, and Sarandë.

Under the Italian protectorate of Albania (1939–1943), the National Bank continued its activity but came under increased commercial competition from Banco di Napoli and Banca Nazionale del Lavoro, which developed their operations in Albania. The National Bank opened a branch in Prizren which had then been annexed to Albania. It also considered extending its activity to Montenegro, but that project was not carried out. Its monetary stance became severely inflationary: its aggregate issued money, which had been 11.1 million francs at end-1937 and 10.5 million at end-1938, rose to 26.3 million at end-1939, 80.2 million at end-1940, and 108.4 million at end-1941.

Under the German occupation of Albania from September 1943, the National Bank kept operating but under increasingly difficult conditions, and was forced by the occupiers to transfer its gold reserves from Rome to Berlin.

=== State Bank ===
Following the country's liberation from German occupation in late 1944, the Albanian operations of the National Bank were nationalized on 13 January 1945 and renamed the Albanian State Bank. The National Bank's Italian legal entity was liquidated in 1957. The State Bank initially operated under a strict monobank system, with an internal department handling retail savings created in 1949. The latter was subsequently renamed the Institute of Saving Accounts and Insurance, while still being hosted by the State Bank. On 1 January 1970, a separate Agricultural Bank was established but remained within the concept of a single-tier banking system.

=== Bank of Albania ===
Shortly after the fall of communism in Albania in December 1990, the country started a profound reform of its financial sector. The Albanian Commercial Bank (Albanian: Bankës Tregtare Shqiptare, BTSH) was established on 1 January 1991 as a spin-off of the State Bank's commercial banking activities, and took over the State Bank's branches outside Tirana. On 1 January 1993 BTSH merged with another State Bank spin-off, the Albanian National Bank (Albanian: Banka Kombëtare e Shqipërisë, BKSH, est. 1992), to form Banka Kombëtare Tregtare (BKT, lit. 'National Commercial Bank'); the latter was privatized in 2000 and subsequently controlled by Çalık Holding.

The Institute of Saving Accounts and Insurance was renamed the Savings Bank and spun off in 1991, eventually privatized in 2004 as Raiffeisen Bank Albania (Albanian: Raiffeisen Bank Shqipëri).

In 1992, the State Bank was renamed the Bank of Albania and focused on its central banking role as fit for the newly established two-tier banking system.

In 1996, an agreement was reached to return most of the former National Bank's gold reserves to Albania.

== Operations ==
The bank's primary objective is the maintenance of price stability. The bank also promotes and supports the development of the foreign exchange regime and system, the domestic financial market, the payment system, and contributes to improving monetary and lending conditions.

The Bank also acts as manager of the county's currency by balancing the currency in circulation and credit within the economy. This role is important because allowing too much currency into circulation would lead to inflation and allowing too little currency in circulation would prevent the economy from growing. As acting currency manager, the Bank of Albania pursues to reach equilibrium between two extremes, which is to promote economic growth by maintaining price stability.

The Bank also acts as the fiscal agent of the Albanian Government. Since being the central Bank of Albania, the bank performs a wide range of financial services dealing with billions of Albanian Leks. The government keeps an open account with the bank, through which it makes many domestic and international financial transactions. The Treasury operations, which consist of receipts and expenses made by the government is not carried out within the Bank of Albania, but through commercial banks.

=== Monetary policy ===
The monetary policy of Albania is an exclusive right of the Bank of Albania. The primary goal of its monetary policy is achieving and maintaining price stability. The architect of coming up with the policy is based on, the respective legal framework, the academic background employed for modeling and predicting inflation on suitability of the operational target and the set of monetary instruments used to finalize the monetary policy goals. The Bank of Albania is committed to achieving and maintaining annual inflation at 3.0%, with a tolerance band of +/- 1 percentage point. The annual inflation for the third quarter of 2014 was 1.7%.

The Bank of Albania manages open market operations through the purchase or sale of securities. These transactions play a main role in the transmission of monetary policy in the banking system. The main reason of using open market operations is the short-term liquidity management of the banking system and trying to stabilize market interest rates. The standing facilities are tools available to banks at their own initiative without restriction under normal circumstances. They consist of tools providing and absorbing overnight liquidity. The interest rates and these tools provide a passage in which the money market interest rates can fluctuate. The minimum reserve requirements serve as a tool targeting at regulating the banking system liquidity and stabilizing the money market interest rates. The amount of minimum reserves to be held by each commercial bank is determined in relation to its reserve base applying the required reserve ratio. This ratio is also the same for the Lek and foreign currency liabilities. The current required ratio is 10 percent. The Bank of Albania's minimum reserve system allows banks to use the averaging provisions. Banks are allowed to 40 percent if their required reserve. They must show the average of the reserve balance will not be less than the reserve requirement by the end of the maintenance period. Required reserves denominated in the Albanian currency are reimbursed at a rate derived from the base rate, while holdings of required reserves in foreign currency are also reimbursed at a rate derived from the base rate of the European Central Bank and Federal Reserve.

=== Banking Supervision ===
The Bank of Albania supervises and regulates all activity of banks and institutions operating banking activity within the country. The Bank of Albania enforces rules on the establishment of banks and institutions and licenses them. The bank also supervises and monitors all activity of these institutions to ensure that they follow and obey the laws and regulations.

The central bank supervises the banking system for the following purposes:

- to promote stability of the banking system and to protect the interests of depositors and the general public;
- to ensure a sound banking system whose activities are transparent to and governed by market economy;
- to provide an environment of confidence for investors and depositors while enabling growth and profitability for the industry.

The role of banking supervision is to promote safety and soundness by:

- ensuring through a licensing process that only fit and proper owners and management, that fulfill the legal, professional and ethical requirements, have the right to enter the banking market; and that they have adequate capital in line with the risks to be undertaken, and have operating policies and procedures to control those risks;
- ensuring that existing banks operate soundly in accordance with law and regulations, have adequate capital and liquidity for foreseeable needs, maintain satisfactory asset quality and adequate resources to offset perceived risks, exercise international standards for best practice in the management of their activities, and conduct their affairs in a manner that is not harmful to clients and general public;
- ensuring that banking problems are resolved quickly and efficiently in a manner that protects depositors to the fullest extent possible, and minimizes the cost to Government and public.

To fulfill this role, banking supervision:

- drafts and revises regulations governing entry to the system, prudential operation of banking activities while in the system, monitors the results achieved, receivership and conservation-ship of banks, and enforces compliance with those laws and regulations;
- establishes pro-active policies and strategies for the supervision of individual banks and the banking system that are based upon an assessment of inherent risks;
- develops supervisory procedures, standards and guidelines that are consistent with international practice;
- implements those procedures, standards and guidelines consistently;
- assures adequacy of staff in terms of number and proficiency to properly supervise the industry;
- sponsors and participates in regular communications with the industry and other supervisors on matters of common interest or concern.

== Leadership ==
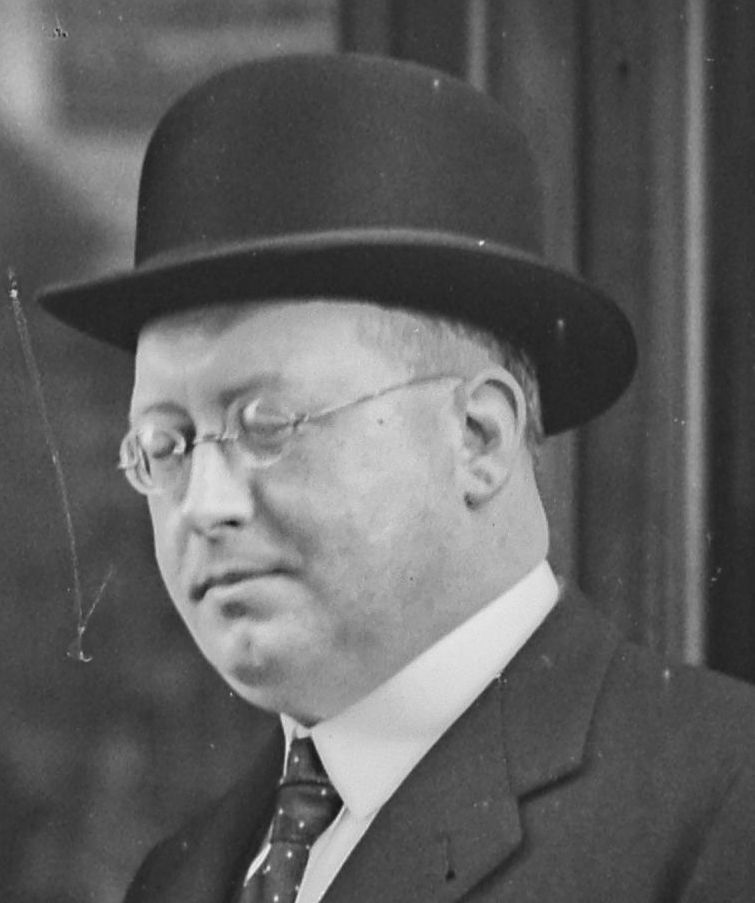
Mario Alberti (1884-1939), chief executive of Credito Italiano and first president of the National Bank of Albania

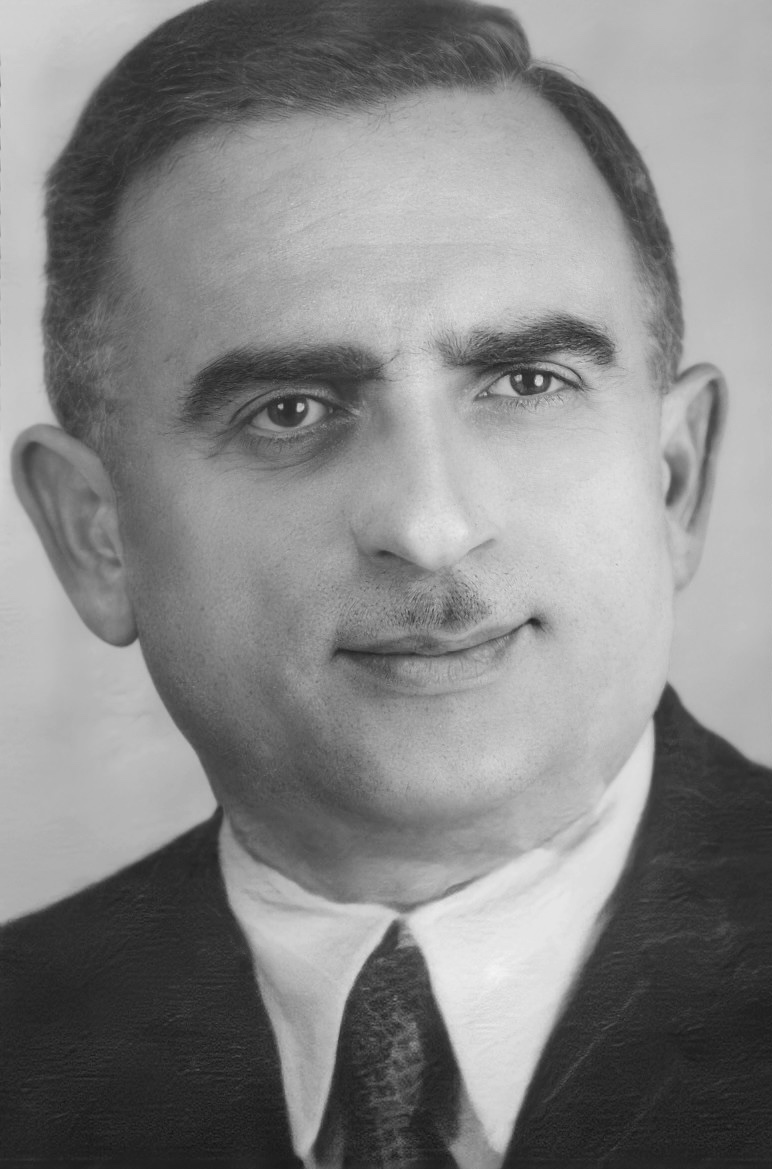
Kostandin Boshnjaku (1888-1953), first director-general of the Albanian State Bank

=== Presidents of the National Bank of Albania ===
- Mario Alberti, 2 September 1925 - 25 March 1931
- Giuseppe Bianchini, 25 March 1931 - 25 March 1935
- Antonio Mosconi, 25 March 1935 - 8 September 1943

=== Directors-General of the Albanian State Bank ===
- Kostandin Boshnjaku, 17 January 1945 - 2 April 1946
- Abdyl Këllezi, 1946 - 1948
- Spiro Bakalli, 1948 - 1966
- Zeqir Lika, 1 April 1966 - 15 February 1974
- Llazar Gjika, 2 February 1974 - 16 November 1974
- Aleks Verli, 2 November 1974 - 1 March 1976
- Kostaq Postoli, 1 March 1976 - 15 July 1984
- Andrea Nako, 16 July 1984 - 15 July 1985
- Kamber Myftari, 16 September 1986 - 28 February 1989
- Qirjako Mihali, March 1989 - December 1990
- Niko Gjyzari, 1 January 1991 - 31 August 1991

=== Governors of the Bank of Albania ===
- Ilir Hoti, 1 May 1992 - 1 September 1993
- Dylber Vrioni, 1 September 1993 - 1 December 1994
- Kristaq Luniku, 1 December 1994 - 1 April 1997
- Qamil Tusha, 15 April 1997 - 10 September 1997
- Shkëlqim Cani, 10 September 1997 - 28 October 2004
- Ardian Fullani, 28 October 2004 - 7 September 2014
- Elisabeta Gjoni, 7 September 2014 - 5 February 2015 (acting)
- Gent Sejko, since 5 February 2015

== Buildings ==
From 1925 to 1938, the bank's center of operations in Albania was its office in Durrës, for which it erected a prominent building facing the port, designed by architect Vittorio Ballio Morpurgo and completed in November 1928. On 30 October 1938, the bank inaugurated a new Albanian central office on what is now Skanderbeg Square in the capital Tirana, which took over the central functions that were previously in Durrës. The Tirana building was also designed by Morpurgo, who worked on it between 1930 and 1936. In addition, Morpurgo designed the bank's branches in Korçë, Shkodër, and Vlorë.

During the Communist era, the State Bank kept using the buildings erected for its predecessor during the interwar period. In 1993, the newly established Banka Kombëtare Tregtare (BKT) took over the former regional branch buildings, while the central bank kept the Tirana head office and later established new regional branches of its own.

On 10 February 2010, the Bank of Albania inaugurated its training and research center in Berat, in a building originally erected in the 1970s and remodeled in the late 2000s to better fit with the historic city's environment. In June 2010, the bank also purchased the former Hotel Dajti, a prominent building in the center of Tirana not very far from its own head office, to host functions open to stakeholders and the public. In the early 2010s, the Tirana head office building itself was renovated and expanded on a design by the Italian firm Petreschi Architects.

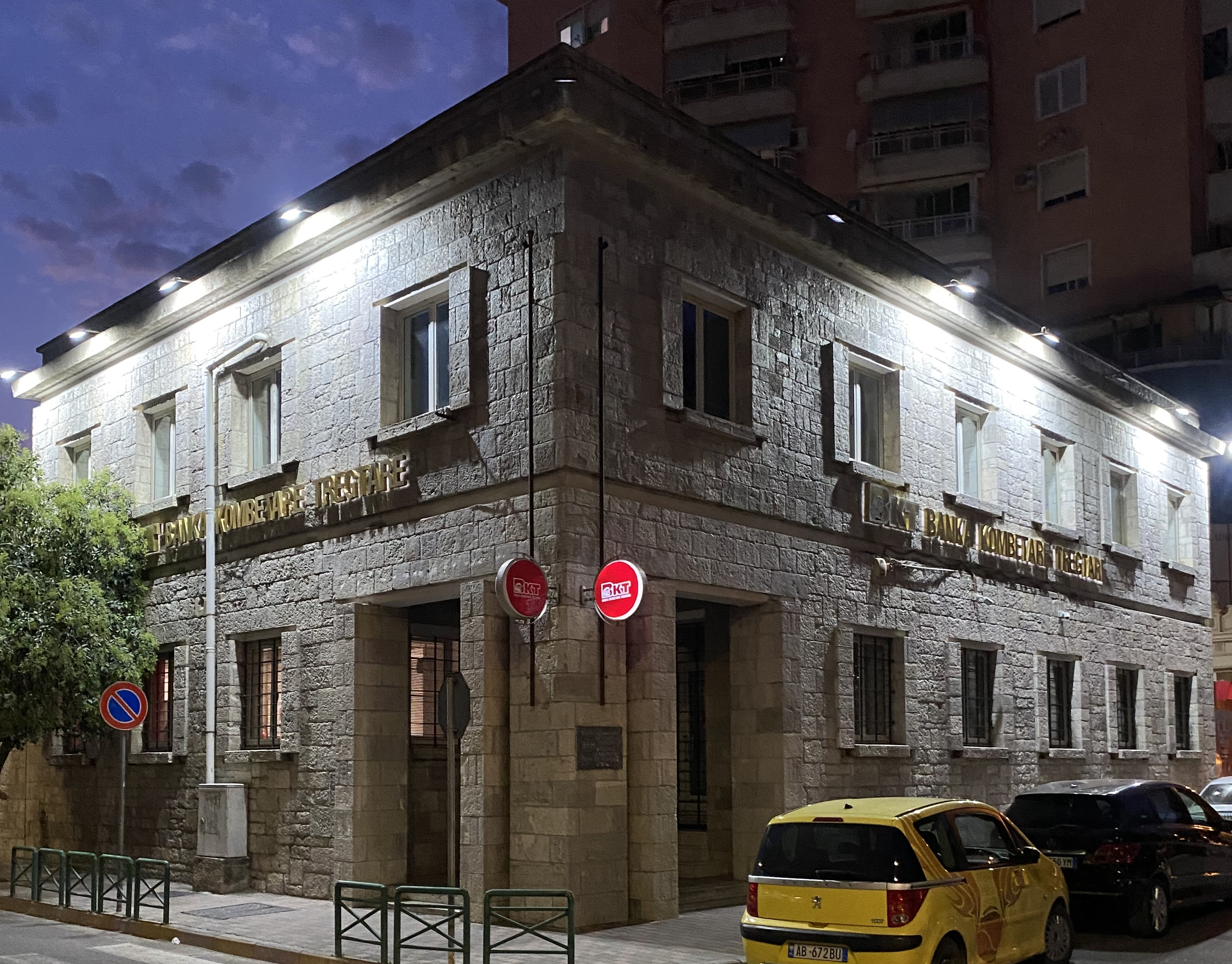
Former National Bank building in Elbasan, converted into BKT branch

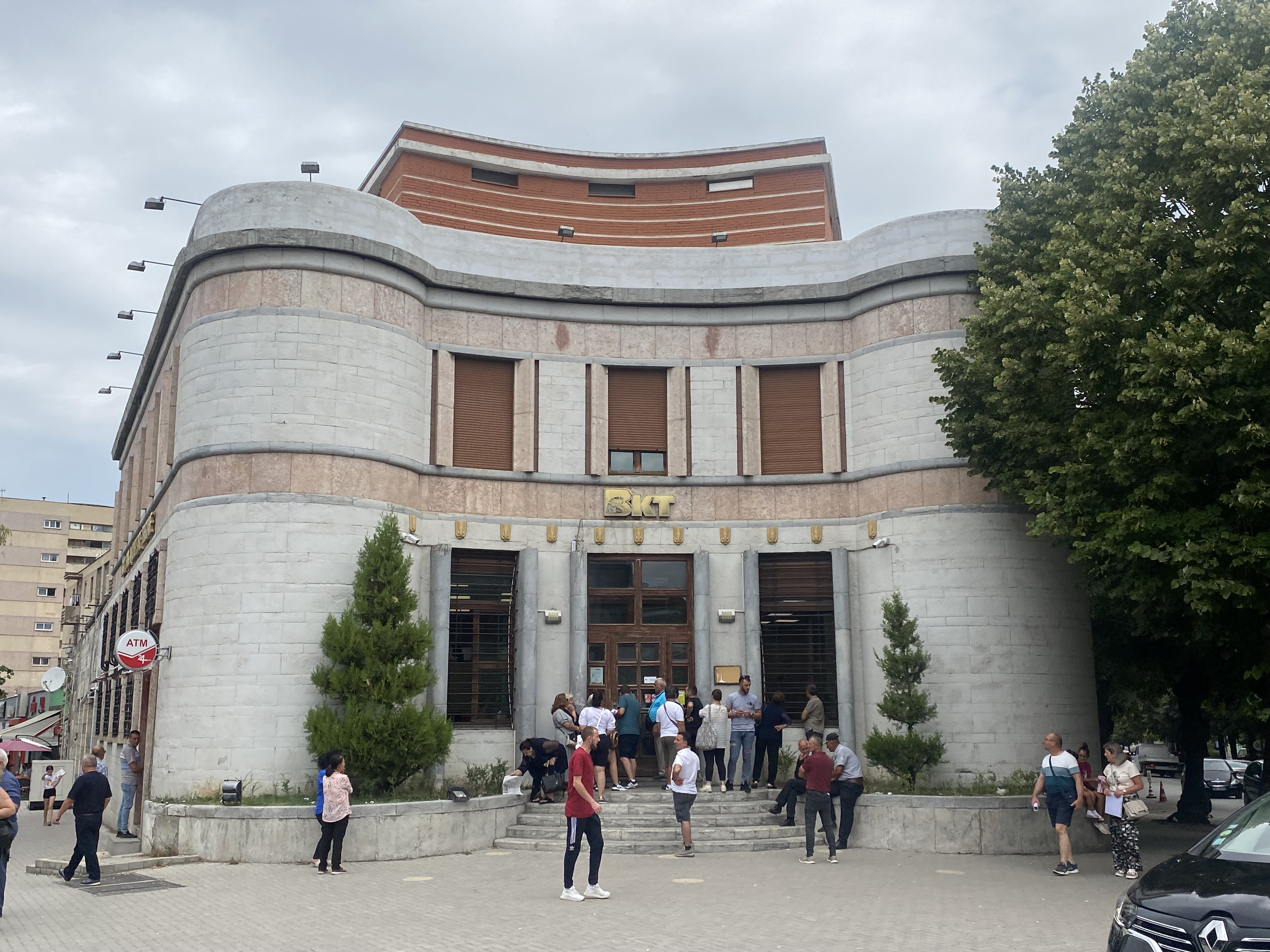
Former National Bank building in Korçë, converted into BKT branch

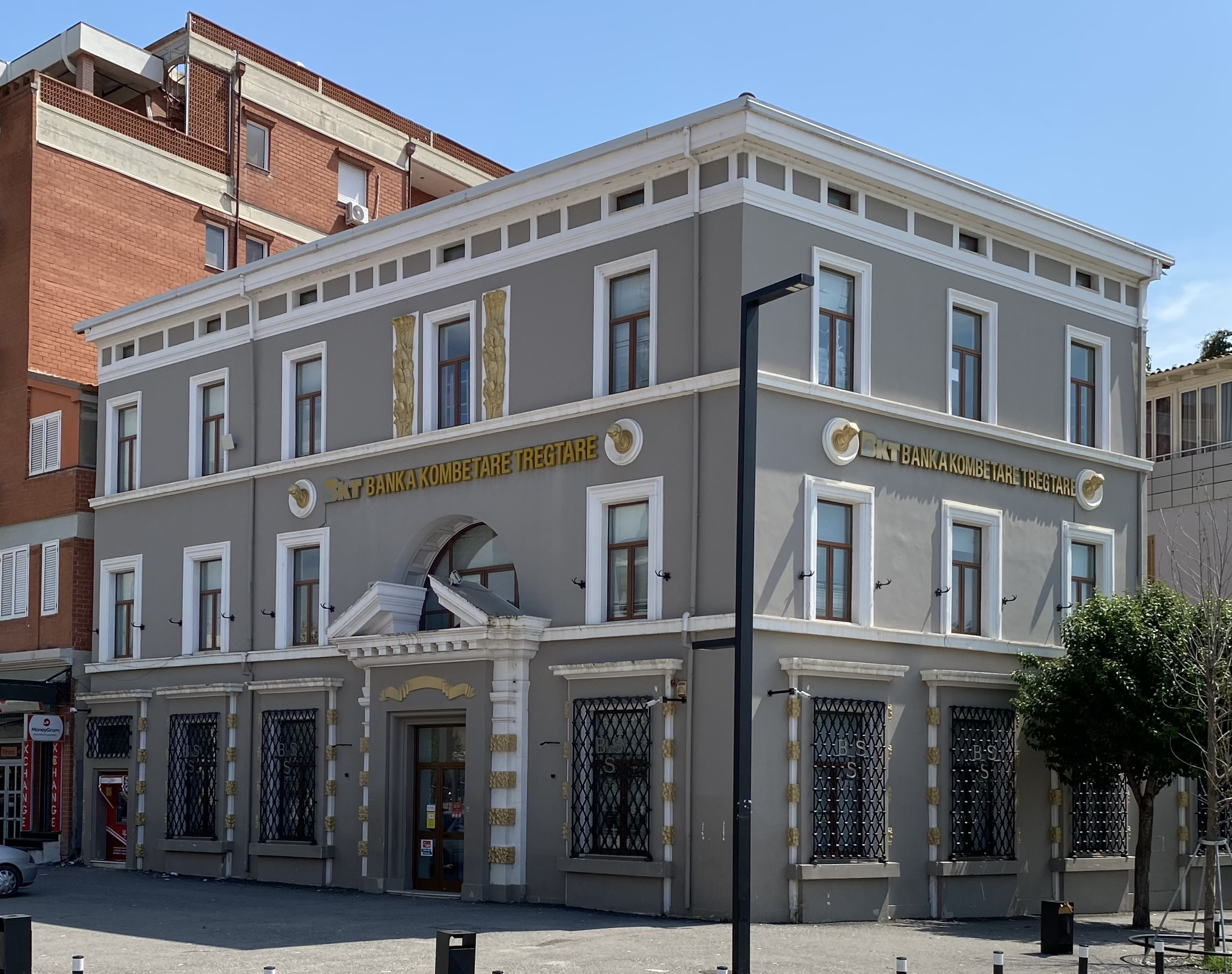
Former National Bank building in Vlorë, converted into BKT branch

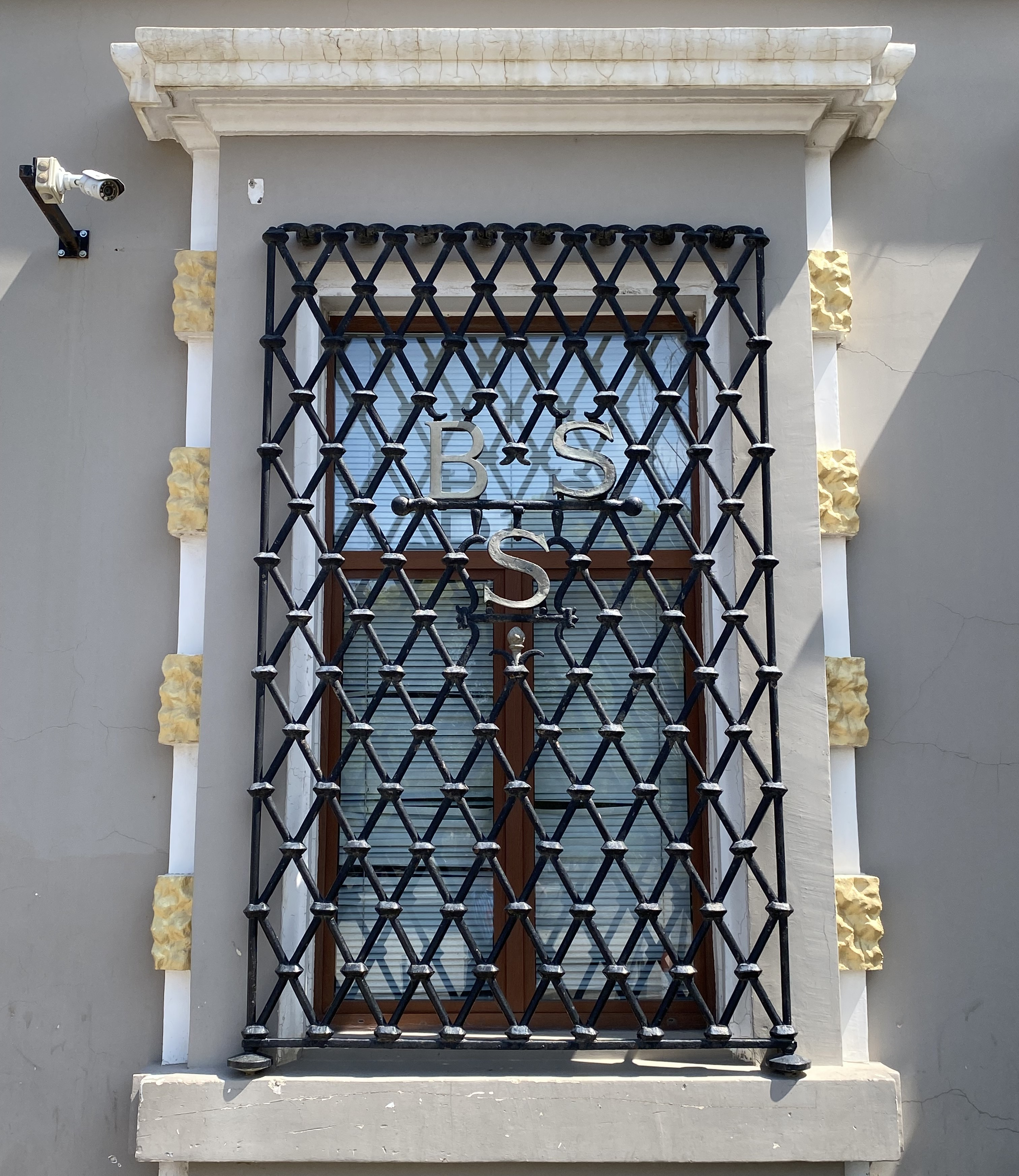
Detail of ironwork in the former Vlora branch, displaying the Communist-era initials BSS

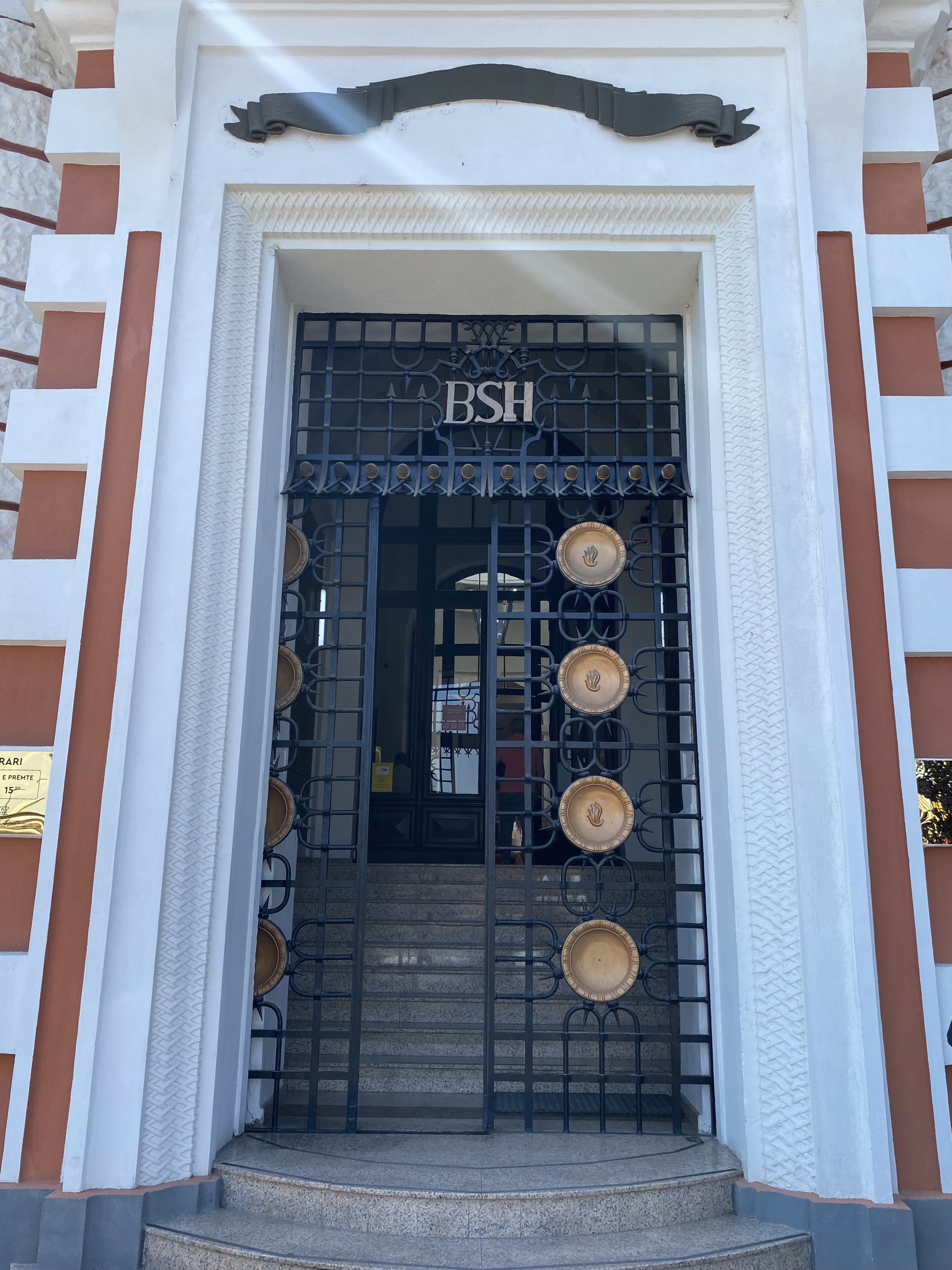
Entrance of the former Durrës building, with the same initials modified in the early 1990s to BSH

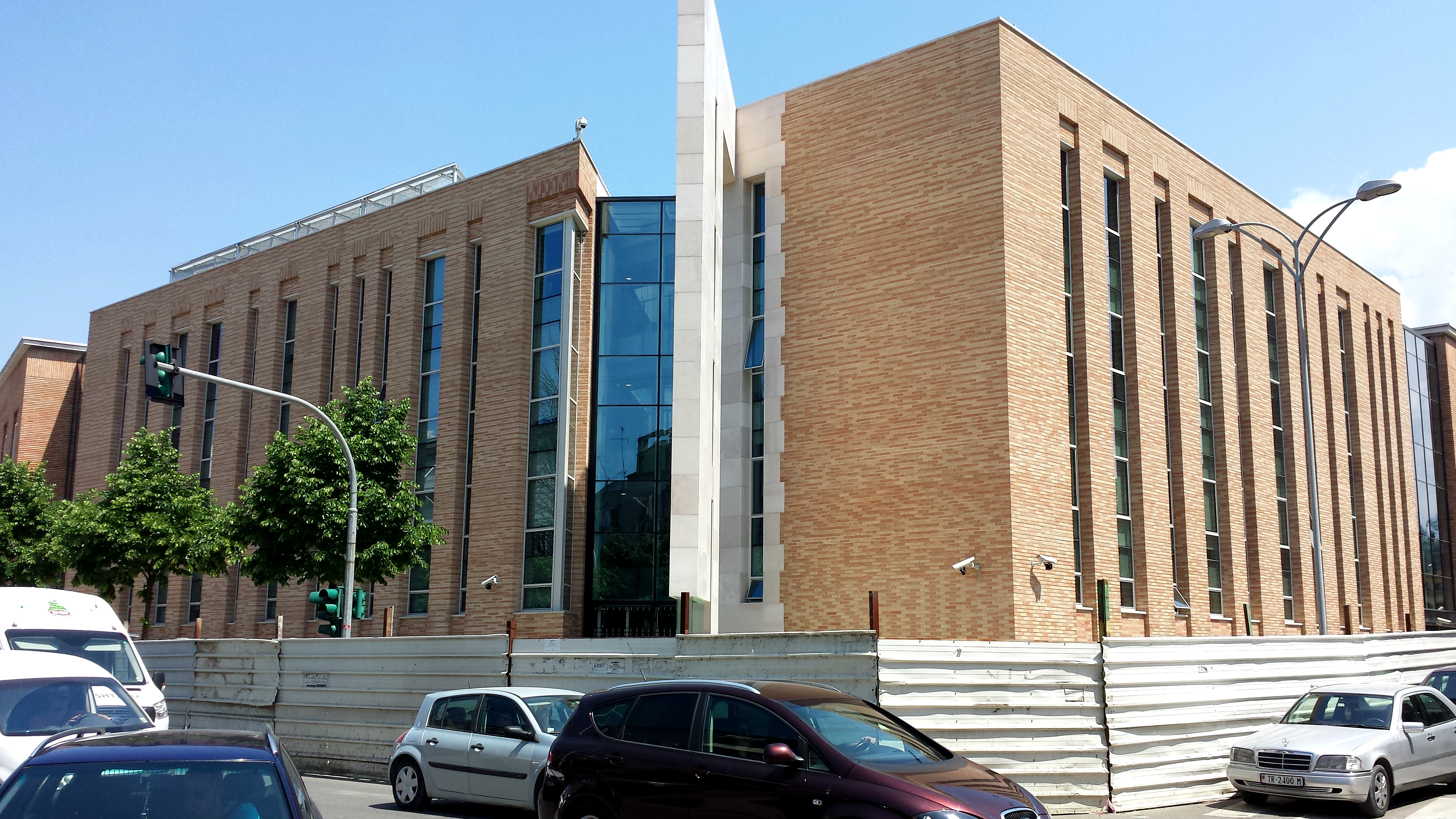
Bank of Albania headquarters expansion, completed in 2014

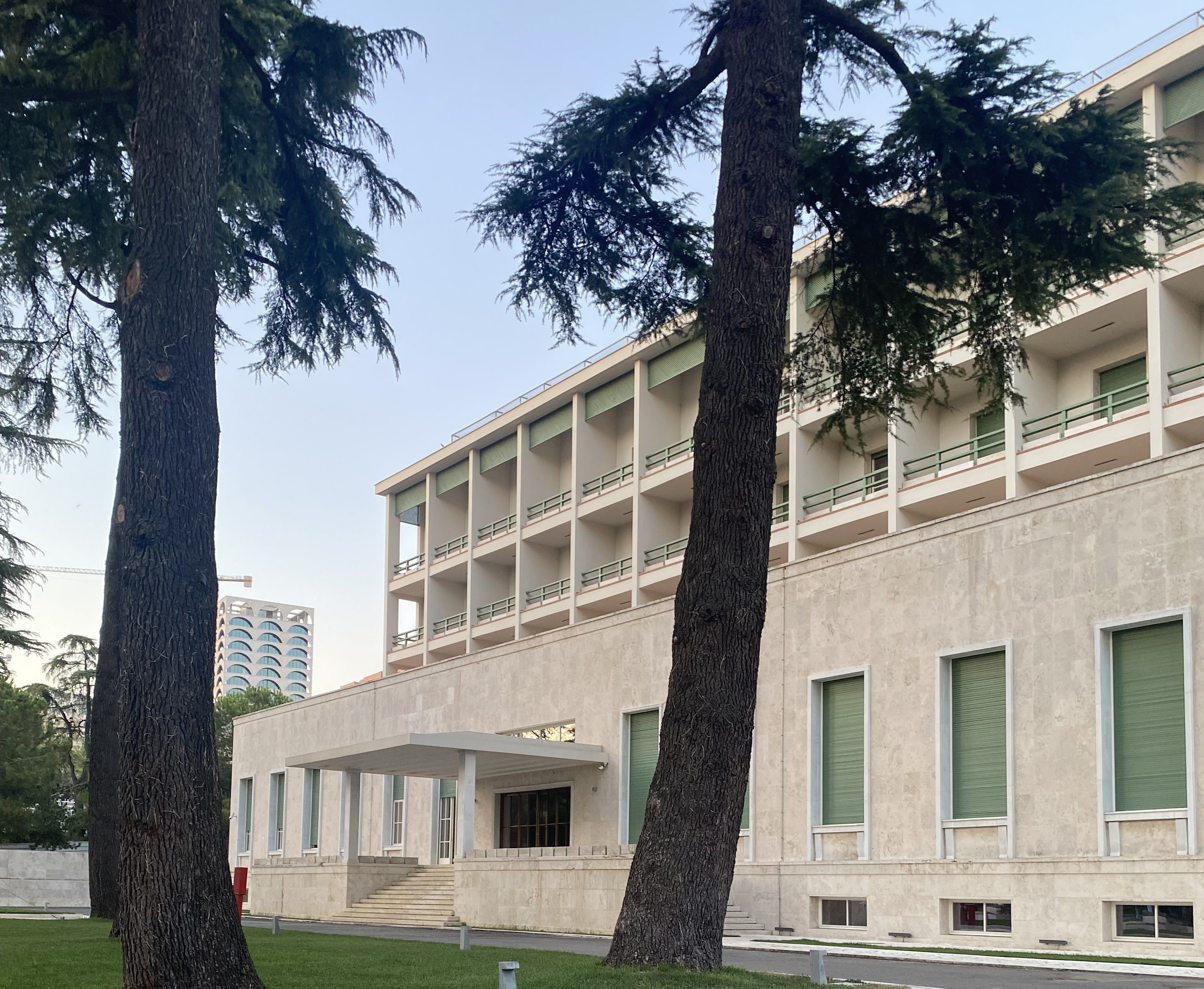
Former Hotel Dajti in Tirana, renovated by the Bank of Albania as extension of its head office

== See also ==
- Economy of Albania
- Franga
- Albanian lek
- Vlorë frank
- Korçë frange
- Monetary Gold Removed from Rome in 1943 (Italy v. France, United Kingdom and United States)
- List of central banks
