= Franga =

1926–1939 currency of Albania

- 100 Franga Coin with portrait of Zogu

Unit
- Symbol: Fr
- Nickname: Leku i Zogut (Zogu's Lek)

Denominations
- Subunit
- 1/100: Qindark ari
- Symbol
- Qindark ari: q
- Banknotes
- Freq. used: 5, 20, and 100 Franga
- Coins
- Freq. used: 10, 20, 50 and 100 Franga

Demographics
- Date of withdrawal: 1946
- Replaced by: Albanian lek
- User(s): Albanian Republic; Albanian Kingdom

Issuance
- Central bank: Bank of Albania

Valuation
- Value: 1 Fr = L5
- This infobox shows the latest status before this currency was rendered obsolete.

The franga [fɾaŋa] is an obsolete unit of currency, equal to 5 lek, used in the Albanian Republic and Albanian Kingdom under Zogu. Coins denominated in Franga were in use from 1926 until 1939.

== Coins ==
Between 1926 and 1938, 1, 2, and 5 franga coins were issued in silver (.835 fine for the two lower values, .900 fine for the five-franga coins), while 10, 20, 50, and 100 franga pieces were minted in gold (.900 fine).

Fractional pieces denominated in lek and qindarka were also issued during the period.

== Banknotes ==
An undated series of banknotes was issued by the National Bank of Albania in 1926. It comprised 1, 5, 20, and 100 franga notes, the first of which was recalled shortly after being released into circulation.

In 1939, during the Italian occupation, the 100 franga notes were overprinted to obscure the image of King Zog I.

== Gallery ==
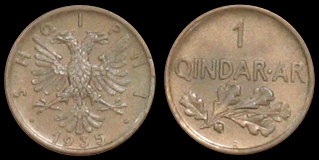
1 Qindar Ar 1935

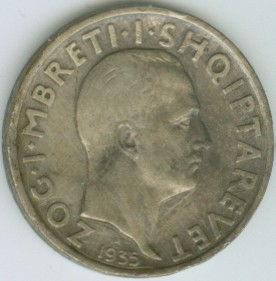
1 Frang Ar - Zog I

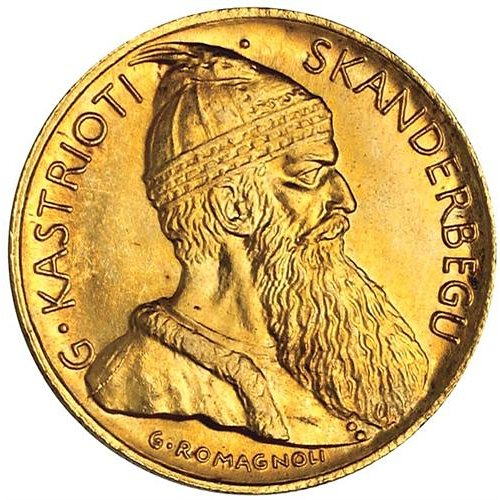
20 Franga, portrait of Skanderbeg

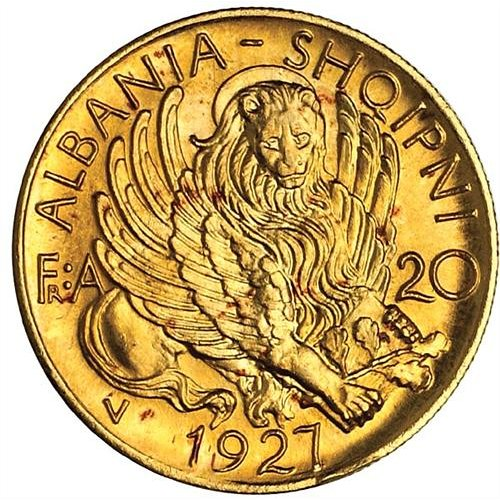
20 Franga

100 Franga Ari Zog

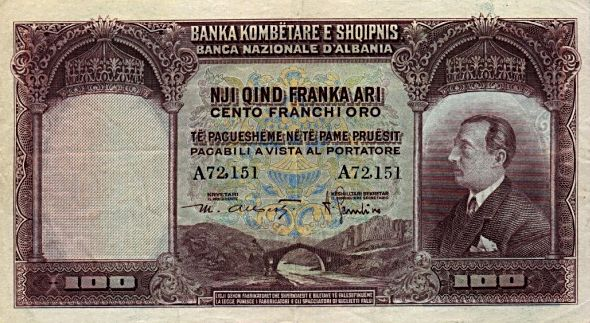
100 Franga with portrait of Zogu.

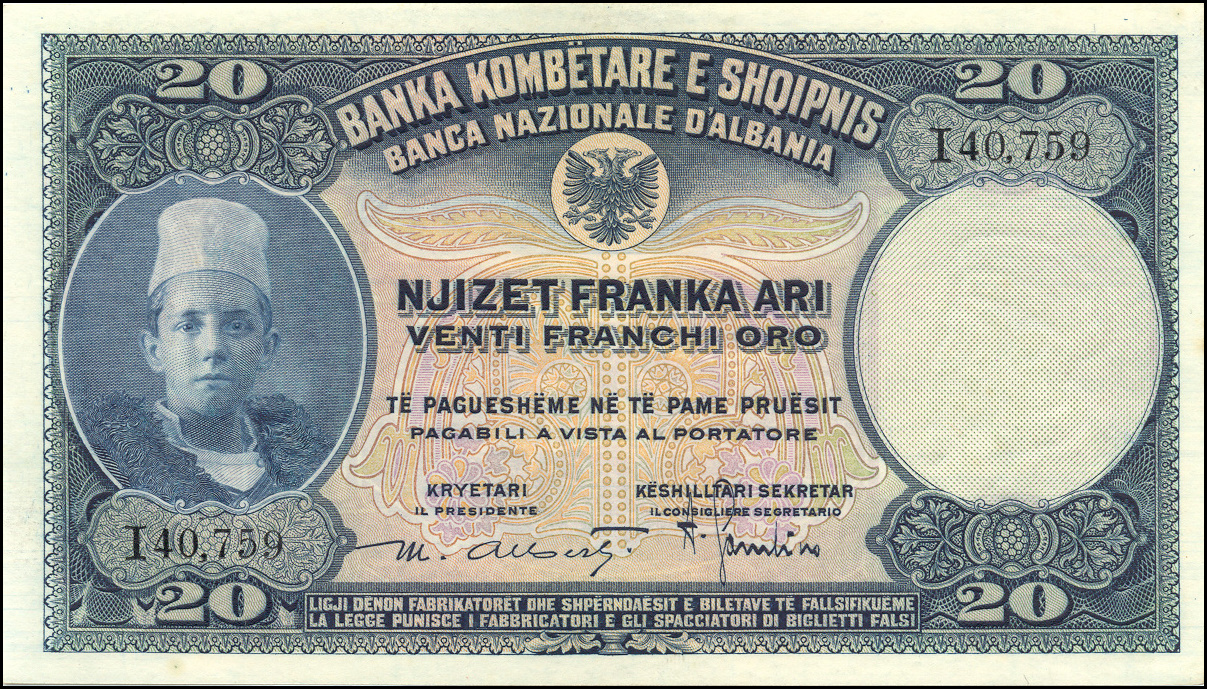
20 Franga

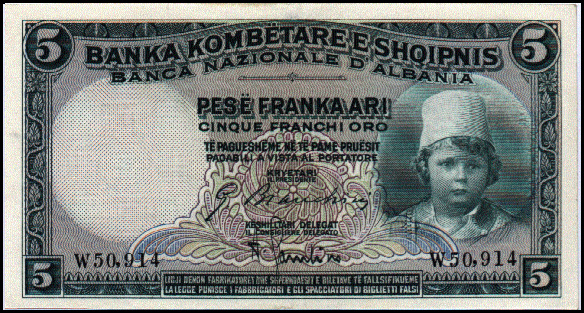
5 Franga

== See also ==
- Korçë frange
- Albanian lek
- Economy of Albania
