= Vlorë frank =

Albanian currency

The frank was the currency of Vlorë, issued in 1924. It was subdivided into 100 qindtar. It was only issued in paper money form, with denominations of 10 and 25 qindtar, 1 and 2 frank. It was replaced by the Albanian franc in 1926.
