= Korçë frange =

Currency of the Republic of Korçë

The frange (Albanian) or franc (French) was the currency of the Republic of Korçë (also written "Koritza" on the currency) between 1917 and 1921. It was subdivided into 100 centimes. The currency was introduced during the period of French occupation. It was only issued in paper money form, with notes issued in denominations of 50 centimes, 1 and 5 frange. After the end of the French occupation, the frange was replaced by the skender in 1921.

== See also ==
- Franga
- Albanian lek
- Economy of Albania
