= Albanian lek =

Albanian currency

Leku shqiptar (Albanian)
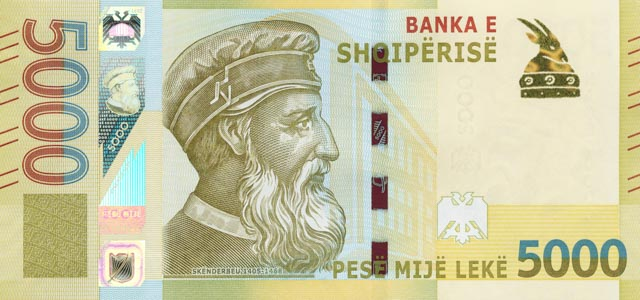
5000 Lekë banknote
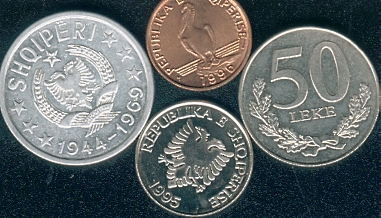
Lekë coins

ISO 4217
- Code: ALL (numeric: 008) before 1990: ALK
- Subunit: 0.01

Units of account
- Base unit: lek
- Plural: lekë
- Symbol: L
- Subunit
- 1/100: qindarkë
- Plural
- qindarkë: qindarka

Denominations
- Banknotes
- Freq. used: 200, 500, 1,000, 2,000, 5,000 Lekë
- Rarely used: 10,000 Lekë
- Coins
- Freq. used: 5, 10, 20, 50, 100 Lekë
- Rarely used: 1 Lek

Demographics
- Date of introduction: 16 February 1926
- User(s): Albania

Issuance
- Central bank: Bank of Albania
- Website: www.bankofalbania.org

Valuation
- Inflation: 1.9%
- Source: April 2025

The lek (Albanian: leku shqiptar; indefinite singular lek, definite plural lekët, indefinite plural lekë; sign: L; code: ALL) is the currency of Albania. Historically, it was subdivided into 100 qintars (Albanian: qindarka; singular qindarkë).

== History ==
=== Medieval Albanian currency ===
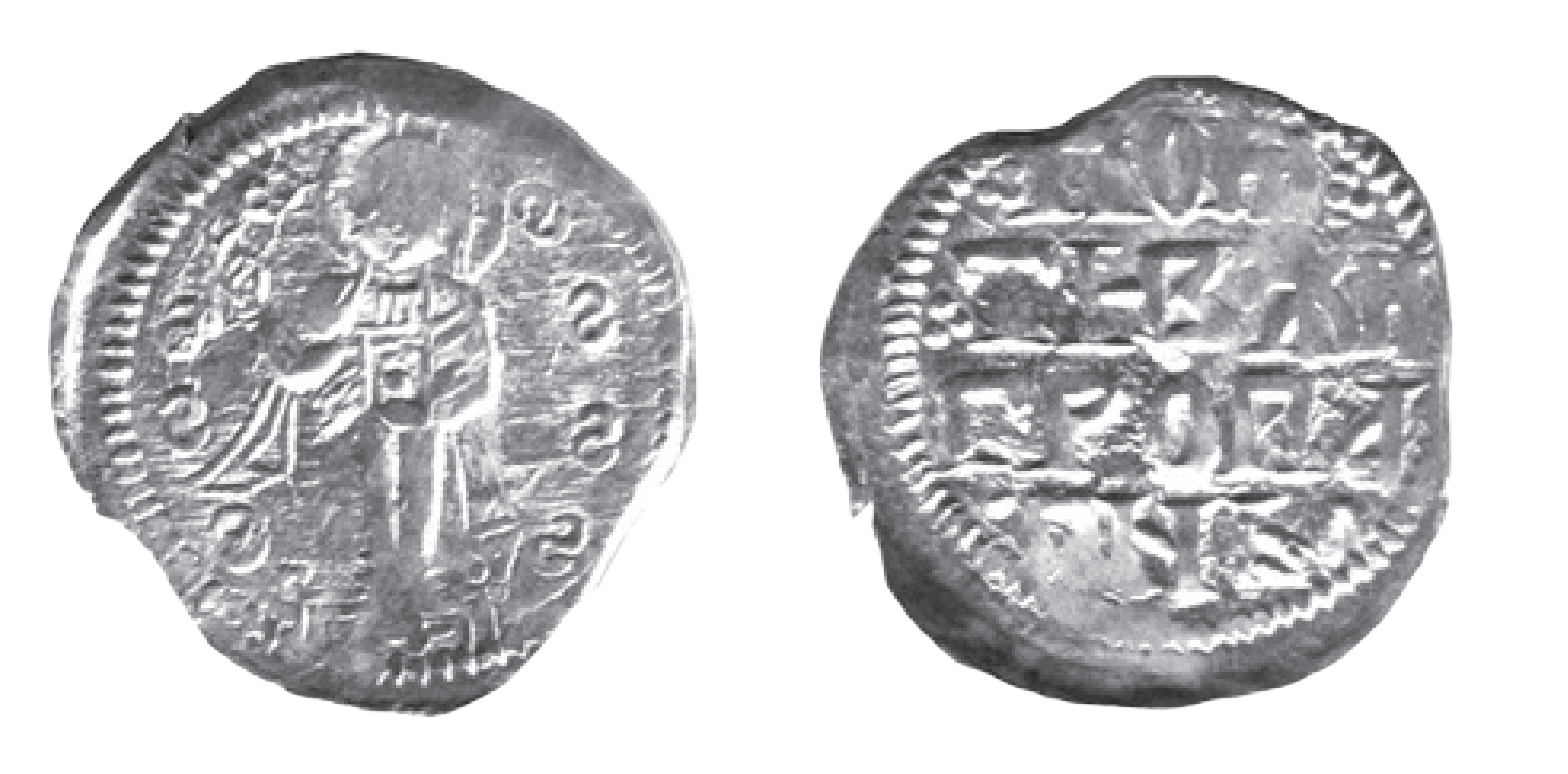
Currency of Andrea Gropa Minted in Ohrid in the Principality of Gropa.

The earliest coins produced in Albanian lands date to the 14th and 15th centuries when the various local principalities began issuing their own currency. Such as the Principality of Albania and Principality of Gropa. Alongside the feudal lords several autonomous towns in Albania such as Shkodër, Durrës, and Drisht struck their own coins as well.The production of these coins largely ended in the late 15th to 16th centuries following the Ottoman conquest of Albania.

=== First modern currency (1926) ===
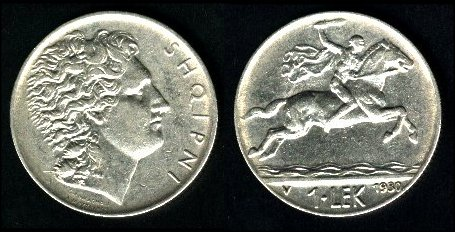
Alexander the Great on the first Albanian 1 Lek coin.

The lek was introduced as the first Albanian currency in February 1926.

Before then, Albania was a country without a currency, using a gold standard to fix commercial values. Before the First World War, the Ottoman Turkish piastre was in full circulation. During the occupation of Albania by Austria-Hungary, paper notes of the Austro-Hungarian krone were imposed on the population. Albanians were reluctant to use these notes and only did so in exchanges with the occupiers. The majority of the population used gold and silver piastres, or gave up on money altogether and bartered instead. In 1923, Italian paper circulated at Shkodër, Durrës, Vlorë, and Gjirokastër, and the Greek drachma at Korçë, the values of which varied according to locality and the prevailing rates of exchange as compared with gold.

=== Gold standard ===
From 1926 to 1939, the Albanian leke adhered to the gold standard de jure, with leke banknotes being convertible to gold. The leke's conversion to gold was guaranteed and the issue of gold francs was limited to three million units. Due to the gold standard, until 1939, the leke did not undergo significant inflation, and the amount of currency in circulation remained relatively constant. Following the Italian invasion of Albania, the entire gold reserves of Albania, totaling 300,000 gold francs, were confiscated and sent to the Reichsbank in Berlin. This action, coupled with the introduction of the Italian lira in Albania, led to significant inflation and the devaluation of the leke.

=== Etymology ===
The naming of this currency as "Leke" has two conflicting stories:

1. It was named after Lekë Dukagjini. This is considered the official etymology, based on discussions in the Parliament of Albania in 1922.
2. It is named after Alexander the Great, whose name is often shortened to Leka in Albanian. where Alexander's portrait appeared on the obverse of the 1 lek coin, while the reverse showed him on his horse.

The word qindarkë comes from the Albanian qind, meaning one hundred, or from Arabic qintār ("hundredweight"). The word is thus comparable to centime, cent, Latin centenarius, Quintal etc.

=== Franga ===
Between 1926 and 1939, the main unit of Albanian currency was the franga ari (English: gold franc) (Fr.A.), worth 5 Lek and divided into 100 qindar ar (gold cent), used in international transactions. This unit was similar in concept to the Belga, a unit worth five Belgian francs.

== Coins ==
=== First lek ===
In 1926, bronze coins were introduced in denominations of 5 and 10 qintars, together with nickel 1/4 Lek, 1/2 Lek and 1 Lek, and silver Fr.A. 1, Fr.A. 2 and Fr.A. 5 . The obverse of the franc coins depicts King Zog. In 1935, bronze 1 and 2 gold cents were issued, equal in value to the 5 and 10 qintars respectively. This coin series depicted distinct neoclassical motifs, said to have been influenced by the Italian king Victor Emmanuel III who was known to have been a coin collector. These coins depict the mint marks "R", "V" or "L", indicating Rome, Vienna or London.

Under the direction of Benito Mussolini, Italy invaded and occupied Albania and issued a new series of coins in 1939 in denominations of Lek 0.20, Lek 0.50, 1 Lek and 2 Lek in stainless steel, and 5 Lek and 10 Lek in silver. Aluminium-bronze Lek 0.05 and Lek 0.10 were introduced in 1940. A fixed exchange rate with the Italian lira was established at 5:6.25 (1 Lek = Lit.1.25, or Fr.A.1 = Lit.6.25). These coins were issued until 1941 and bear the portrait of Italian King Victor Emmanuel III on the obverse and the Albanian eagle with fasces on the reverse.

In 1947, shortly after the Communist Party took power, older coins were withdrawn from circulation and a new coinage was introduced, consisting of zinc 1/2 Lek, 1 Lek, 2 Lek and 5 Lek. These all depicted the socialist national crest. This coinage was again minted in 1957 and used until the currency reform of 1965.

=== Second lek ===
In 1965, a confiscatory monetary reform was carried out at a rate of 10:1.

Aluminium coins (dated 1964) were introduced in denominations of 5, 10, 20 and 50 qintars and 1 Lek. All coins show the socialist state emblem.

In 1969, a second series of aluminium 5, 10, 20, 50 qintars and 1 Lek coins was released commemorating the 1944 liberation from fascism. The three smallest denominations remained similar in design to the 1964 series but showed "1944-1969" on the obverse. The 50 qintar and lek coins showed patriotic and military images.

In 1988, a third redesign of aluminium 5, 10, 20, 50 qintars and 1 Lek coins was released. The 50 qindarka and 1 Lek coins were problematically identical in size, weight, and appearance, so aluminium-bronze 1 Lek coins with the inscription "Republika Popullore Socialiste e Shqipërisë" were released later that year for better identification. In 1989, a cupro-nickel 2 Lek coin was introduced.

All three of these coin series remained in circulation during and shortly after the 1991 revolution. On 1 January 1992, those coins lost their legal tender status, effectively making qintars obsolete.

==== Foreign exchange certificates ====
Similar to many other socialist countries, Albania issued foreign exchange certificates, which only circulated in specially designated shops, and their exchange into regular lek banknotes was prohibited.

=== Third lek ===
In 1995 and 1996, new coins were introduced in denominations of 1 Lek, 5 Lekë, 10 Lekë, 20 Lekë and 50 Lekë, with a bimetallic 100 Lekë added in 2000. These coins use the letter e instead of the correct ë, but banknotes are spelt correctly.

Coins of the lek (1995–present)
Image		Value	Technical Parameters				Description			Dates	
Obverse	Reverse	Value	Diameter	Thickness	Mass	Composition	Edge	Obverse	Reverse	Minting	Issue
		1 Lek	18.1 mm	1.6 mm	3 g	Bronze (1996), Copper-plated Steel (2008–2013)	Smooth	A pelican in the centre, "Republika e Shqipërisë", year	Nominal value, branches artistically carved in the form of a crown	1996, 2008, 2013	1996
		5 Lekë	20 mm	1.6 mm	3.12 g	Nickel-plated Steel	Smooth	Eagle from the Flag of Albania, "Republika e Shqipërisë", year	Nominal value, branches artistically carved in the form of a crown	1995, 2000, 2011, 2014, 2020	1995
		10 Lekë	21.25 mm	1.5 mm	3.6 g	Aluminum-bronze (1996–2000), Brass-plated Steel (2009–2018)	Milled	Berat Castle, "Republika e Shqipërisë", year	Nominal value, branches artistically carved in the form of a crown	1996, 2000, 2009, 2013, 2018	1996
		20 Lekë	23 mm	2 mm	4.6 g	Aluminum-bronze (1996–2000), Brass-plated Steel (2012–2020)	Milled	A Liburne ship, "Republika e Shqipërisë", year	Nominal value, branches artistically carved in the form of a crown	1996, 2000, 2012, 2016, 2020	1996
		50 Lekë	24.25 mm	1.5 mm	5.5 g	Copper-nickel	Milled	Portrait of the Illyrian King Gentius, Republika e Shqipërisë", year	Nominal value, branches artistically carved in the form of a crown	1996, 2000, 2020	1996
		50 Lekë	24.25 mm		5.5 g	Copper-nickel	Milled	An Illyrian helmet, "Republika e Shqipërisë", "Antikiteti Shqiptar", year	Nominal value, divided by a horizontal line and in the arch above "Antikiteti Shqiptar"	2003	2004
		100 Lekë	24.75 mm	1.9 mm	6.7 g	Bi-Metallic: Aluminium-bronze centre in Copper-nickel ring	Milled	Portrait of the Illyrian Queen Teuta, "Republika e Shqipërisë", year	Nominal value, branches artistically carved in the form of a crown	2000	2000
These images are to scale at 2.5 pixels per millimetre. For table standards, see the coin specification table.											

==== Commemorative coins ====
In 2001, 100 Lekë and 200 Lekë were issued under the theme of Albania's integration into the EU and 50, 100, and 200 lekë under the 500th anniversary of the Statue of David. In 2002, 50 Lekë and 100 Lek were issued for the 90th Anniversary of the Independence of Albania and 20 Lek under the Albanian Antiquity theme. In 2003, 50 lekë was issued in memory of the 100th anniversary of the death of Jeronim De Rada. In 2004, 50 Lekë was issued under the Albanian Antiquity theme depicting traditional costumes of Albania and the ancient Dea. In 2005, 50 Lekë were issued for the 85th anniversary of the proclamation of Tirana as capital and the theme of traditional costumes of Albania.

== Banknotes ==
=== First lek ===
In 1926, the National Bank of Albania (Banka Kombëtare e Shqipnis) introduced notes in denominations of Fr.A. 1, Fr.A. 5, Fr.A. 20 and Fr.A. 100. In 1939, notes were issued in denominations of Fr.A. 5 and Fr.A. 20. These were followed in 1944 with notes for 2 Lek, 5 Lek, 10 Lek, and Fr.A. 100.

In 1945, the People's Bank of Albania (Banka e Shtetit Shqiptar) issued overprints on National Bank notes for 10 Lek, Fr.A. 20 and Fr.A. 100. Regular notes were also issued in 1945 in denominations of 1, Fr.A. 5, Fr.A. 20, Fr.A. 100 and Fr.A. 500. In 1947, the franga-ari was discontinued and the lek was adopted as the main currency unit, with notes issued for 10 Lek, 50 Lek, 100 Lek, 500 Lek and 1000 Lek.

1947 Series
Obverse	Reverse	Value
		10 Lek
		50 Lek
		100 Lek
		500 lekë
		1,000 Lek
1949 and 1957 series
Obverse	Reverse	Value
		10 Lek
		50 Lek
		100 Lek
		500 Lek
		1,000 Lek

=== Second lek ===
In 1965, notes (dated 1964) were introduced by the Banka e Shtetit Shqiptar in denominations of 1 Lek, 3 Lek, 5 Lek, 10 Lek, 25 Lek, 50 Lek and 100 Lek. A second series of notes was issued in 1976 when the country changed its name to the People's Socialist Republic.

Obverse	Reverse	Value	Colour	Obverse	Reverse
1964 and 1976 Series
		1 Lek	Green	Peasant couple with wheat	Rozafa Castle, Shkodër
		3 Lek	Brown	Woman carrying basket of fruit	Vlora
		5 Lek	Purple	Steam train and truck	Ship
		10 Lek	Green	Woman working in a textile mill	Bureaucrats and peasants socializing outside the Palace of Culture, Naim Frashëri
		25 Lek	Dark blue	Woman with wheat, combine harvesting	Mechanized ploughing
		50 Lek	Red	Army on parade, Skanderbeg	Mosin–Nagant rifle, pickaxe, apartment block under construction
		100 Lek	Scarlet	Man showing his son a new hydroelectric dam	Steelworker with oil worker, gesturing grandly, steelworks and oil wells in background
1991 Series
		100 Lek	Purple	Steelworkers in front of a factory	Factory
		500 Lek	Blue, Orange	Woman with sunflowers, denonimation ornament	Mountain landscape

==== 1992 series ====
Due to the shortage of cash in circulation, in 1992, banknotes of 10 and 50 foreign currency leks (Lek Valutë) were issued, with each Lek valutë valued at 50 lekë. The banknotes were in circulation for only one year and were soon replaced by banknotes of the 1992 model. A banknote of 1 Lek valutë was printed, but not put into circulation.

Banknotes of this series were gradually withdrawn from circulation as they were replaced by the new series banknotes:

- The 100 and 200 lek notes were withdrawn on 31 December 2008.
- The 500 lek note was withdrawn on 30 June 2010.
- The 1000 lek note was withdrawn on 31 March 2011.

1992 Series
Image		Value	Dimensions	Main Colour	Description	
Obverse	Reverse	Value	Dimensions	Main Colour	Obverse	Reverse
		1 Lek valutë (not issued)	165×75 mm	Violet	Steel worker	Electrical transmission towers, hydroelectric generator
		10 Lek valutë	165×75 mm	Green	Steel worker	Electrical transmission towers, hydroelectric generator
		50 Lek valutë	165×75 mm	Brown	Steel worker	Electrical transmission towers, hydroelectric generator
		100 Lek	154 × 72 mm	Violet	National fighter	Falcon and mountains
		200 Lek	162 × 78 mm	Brown	Ismail Qemali	Coat of arms of Albania, declaration of independence of Albania
		500 Lek	170 × 78 mm	Blue	Naim Frashëri	Poetry of Frashëri
		1,000 Lek	178 × 78 mm	Green	Skanderbeg	Krujë Castle

==== 1997 series ====
On 11 July 1997, a new series of banknotes dated 1996-97 was introduced.

Notes dated 1996 were printed by De La Rue in the United Kingdom.

The 2000 lek note was introduced in 2008. The 100 lek banknote was rarely seen in circulation until it was demonetised on 31 December 2008, as the 100 lek coin is used instead for its longer circulatory life.

1996 Series
Image		Value	Dimensions	Main Colour	Description	
Obverse	Reverse	Value	Dimensions	Main Colour	Obverse	Reverse
		100 Lek	130 × 66 mm	Purple/Orange	Fan Noli (1882–1965)	First Albanian Parliament building
		200 Lek	138 × 69mm	Brown	Naim Frashëri (1846–1900)	House birthplace of Frashëri
		500 Lek	145 × 68 mm	Blue	Ismail Qemali (1844–1919)	Vlorë independence building
		1,000 Lek	151 × 72 mm	Green	Pjetër Bogdani (1630–1689)	Gothic Church of Vau-Dejës
		2,000 Lek	160 x 72 mm	Purple	King Gent (Gentius) (died 167 BC); three ancient coins	Amphitheatre at Butrinto (near Saranda), yellow gentian (Gentiana lutea)
		5,000 Lek	160 × 72 mm	Olive Green	Skanderbeg (1405–1468)	Krujë Castle

==== 2019–2022 series ====
In 2019, the Bank of Albania unveiled a new series of banknotes, featuring the same themes as seen on the 1997 series, but with improved security features and a change in material for the 200 Lek banknote; now being issued as a polymer banknote.

This series has also introduced a new denomination, the 10,000 Lek, its highest denominated banknote issued for general circulation. The first two denominations issued for this series, the 200 and 5,000 lekë banknote were issued for circulation on 30 September 2019, with the 1,000 Lek and 10,000 Lek banknotes being released on 30 June 2021, and the 2,000 Lek and 500 Lek banknotes being released on 17 January 2022.

2019–2022 series
Image		Value	Dimensions	Main Colour	Description	
Obverse	Reverse	Value	Dimensions	Main Colour	Obverse	Reverse
		200 Lek	125 mm x 65 mm	Brown	Naim Frashëri	House birthplace of Frashëri, paper with a famous verse from one of Frashëri's poems
		500 Lek	132 mm x 69 mm	Blue	Ismail Qemali	Vlorë independence building, the telegraph which was used to announce the country's independence, and the room where the decision was made
		1,000 Lek	139 mm x 69 mm	Green	Pjetër Bogdani	Gothic Church of Vau
		2,000 Lek	146 mm x 72 mm	Purple	King Gent (Gentius); three ancient coins	Amphitheatre at Butrint (near Saranda), yellow gentian (Gentiana lutea)
		5,000 Lek	153 mm x 72 mm	Yellow	Skanderbeg	Krujë Castle, Skanderbeg's monument in Tirana's Skanderbeg Square, and his helmet
		10,000 Lek	160 mm x 72 mm	Red	Asdreni (1872–1947)	Figurative symbols of national flag, first two lines from the national anthem

== Exchange rates ==
Current ALL exchange rates
From Google Finance:	AUD CAD CHF CNY EUR GBP HKD JPY USD
From Yahoo! Finance:	AUD CAD CHF CNY EUR GBP HKD JPY USD
From XE.com:	AUD CAD CHF CNY EUR GBP HKD JPY USD
From OANDA:	AUD CAD CHF CNY EUR GBP HKD JPY USD

== See also ==
- Franga
- Korçë frange
- Economy of Albania

== Bibliography ==
- Meta, Albana (2023). The Middle Ages A Forerunner of a Well-Organized Monetary System (PDF). Bank of Albania. ISBN 978-9-9282-6276-9.
- Spasić, Slađana (2015). СРПСКИ СРЕДЊОВЕКОВНИ НОВАЦ [Serbian Medieval Coinage] (PDF) (in Serbian). НАРОДНИ МУЗЕЈ КРАЉЕВО.
- Zavalani, Tajar (2015). History of Albania. Centre for Albanian Studies. ISBN 978-1-5075-9567-1.
