= Nermin Vlora Falaschi =

Albanian intellectual and feminist

- Born: Nermin Vlora; April 19, 1921; Tirana, Principality of Albania
- Died: November 28, 2004 (aged 83); San Salvador, El Salvador
- Occupations: Intellectual and feminist
- Known for: Great grand daughter of Ismail Kemal

Nermin Vlora Falaschi (19 April 1921 – 28 November 2004) was an Albanian intellectual, feminist and great-grand daughter of Ismail Kemal. Born to Hajit bey Zarshati and Belkize Hanemi, she studied in Kirias in Kamzë and in 1934 she continued to the Institution of ”Nana Mbretneshe” in Tirana. At the age of 17, she met Italian officer and later ambassador Renzo Falascho whom she married and after the Communist takeover, they fled to Italy. Vlora began writing and translating in elementary school where she translated poetry from French and Italian on the radio of Tirana. In Italy she studied law school and she spoke several languages. She died in 2004.

== Biography ==
She studied writing, archeology, history, and anthropology and become known for Albanian feminism. She was also a researcher and interpreter of ancient inscriptions. She traveled to China, England, Portugal, Uganda, Colombia and USA. As a scholar, she specialized in epigraphy. In Italy, she lectured at the Mediterranean Academy and the Dragan European Foundation, both located in Rome; the Academy of Rozzi in Siena, and the Lyceum of Fermo. She also gave a lecture in the University of Pristina in Kosovo. In April 1988, she honored an invitation to speak about her epigraphic work at the University of Warwick in Coventry, England, while in October 1989, she lectured on the Pelasgian Idiom at the New University of Lisbon.

== Honours ==
The International University of Tucson, Arizona conferred on her an Honorary Degree in Comparative Linguistics. The government of Colombia in Bogota, where she had lectured at the Academy of Linguistics, awarded her the Order of San Carlos in appreciation of her studies and findings about the Chibcha pre-Columbian civilization. She founded the Culture Academy ”Iliria”. She died in 2004 and left a large quantity of papers and publications.
