= Structure of the Albanian Armed Forces =

This article represents the structure of the Albanian Armed Forces as of November 2025:

== Chief of the General Staff ==
- Chief of the General Staff, in Tirana
  - General Staff
    - Human Resources Department (J-1)
    - Intelligence Department (J-2)
    - Operations and Training Department (J-3/7)
    - Logistics Department (J-4)
    - Defence Planning and Monitoring Department (J-5/8)
    - Communications Department (J-6)
    - Civil-Military Cooperation Department (J-9)
      - Communication and Information System Agency, in Tirana
    - Health Inspectorate
      - Armed Forces Military Hospital, in Tirana
  - Joint Operations Center, in Tirana
  - Personnel Recruitment Center, in Tirana
  - Material Management Center, in Tirana
  - Military Delegation to NATO, in Brussels
  - Armed Forces General Staff Support Battalion, in Tirana
    - Services Support Company
    - Ceremonial Company
    - Protection Company
    - Transport Support Company
    - Armed Forces Band
    - Security Section
    - Medical Center
    - Military Holiday Homes

=== Land Force ===
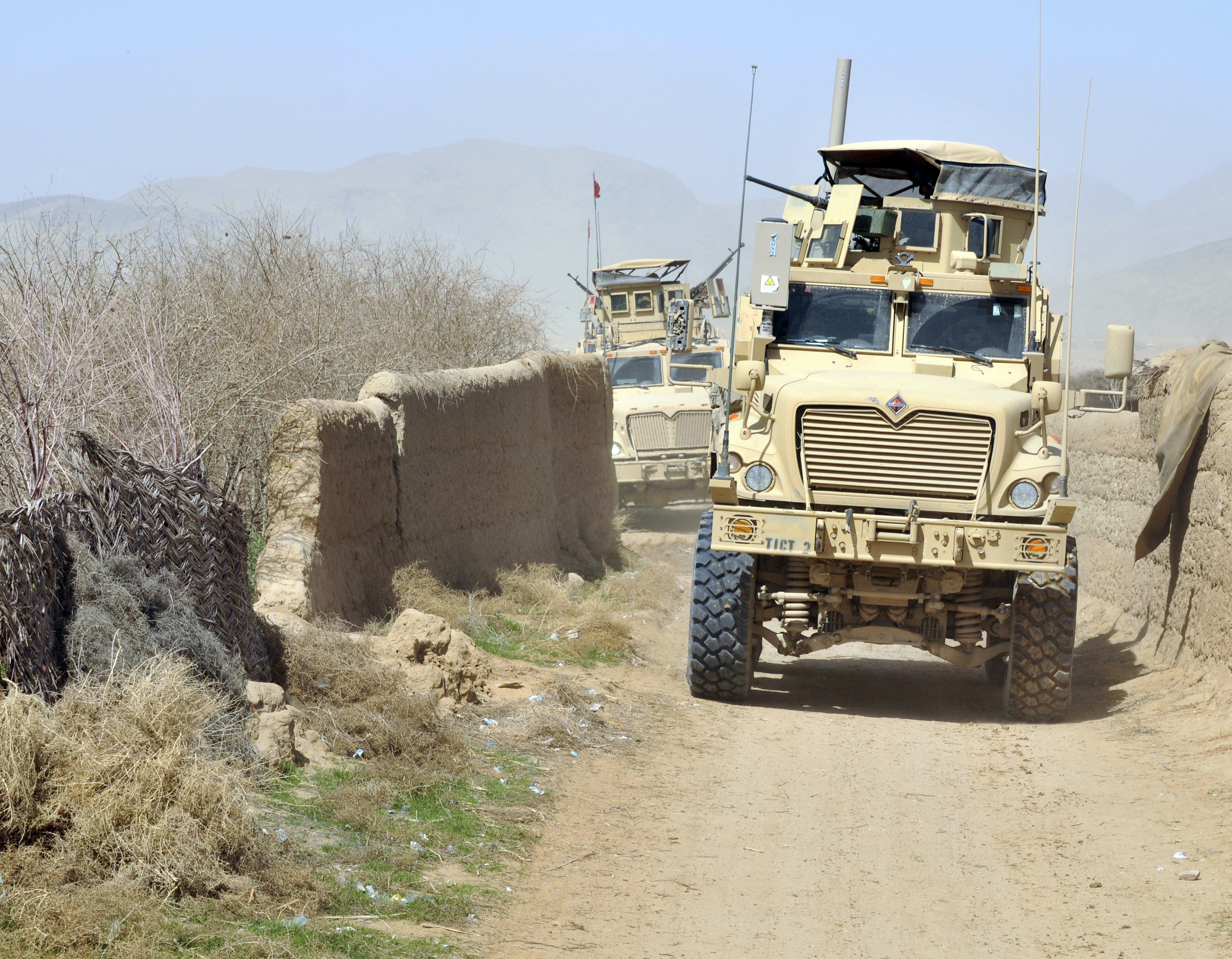
Joint US Army and Albanian Special Operations Battalion patrol in Afghanistan

- Albanian Land Force, in Zall-Herr
  - Staff Support Company, in Zall-Herr
  - Northern Infantry Regiment, in Vau i Dejës
    - 1st Battalion, in Vau i Dejës
    - 2nd Battalion, in Kukës
    - 3rd Battalion, in Burrel
  - Southern Infantry Regiment, in Poshnjë
    - 1st Battalion, in Poshnjë
    - 2nd Battalion, in Berat
    - 3rd Battalion
  - Special Operations Regiment, in Zall-Herr
    - Special Operations Battalion, in Zall-Herr
    - Commando Battalion, in Zall-Herr
  - Light Infantry Battalion, in Zall-Herr (assigned to NATO Response Force)
  - Combat Support Battalion, in Zall-Herr
  - "Zall-Herr" Garrison, in Zall-Herr
  - Training Center, in Zall-Herr

=== Air Force ===
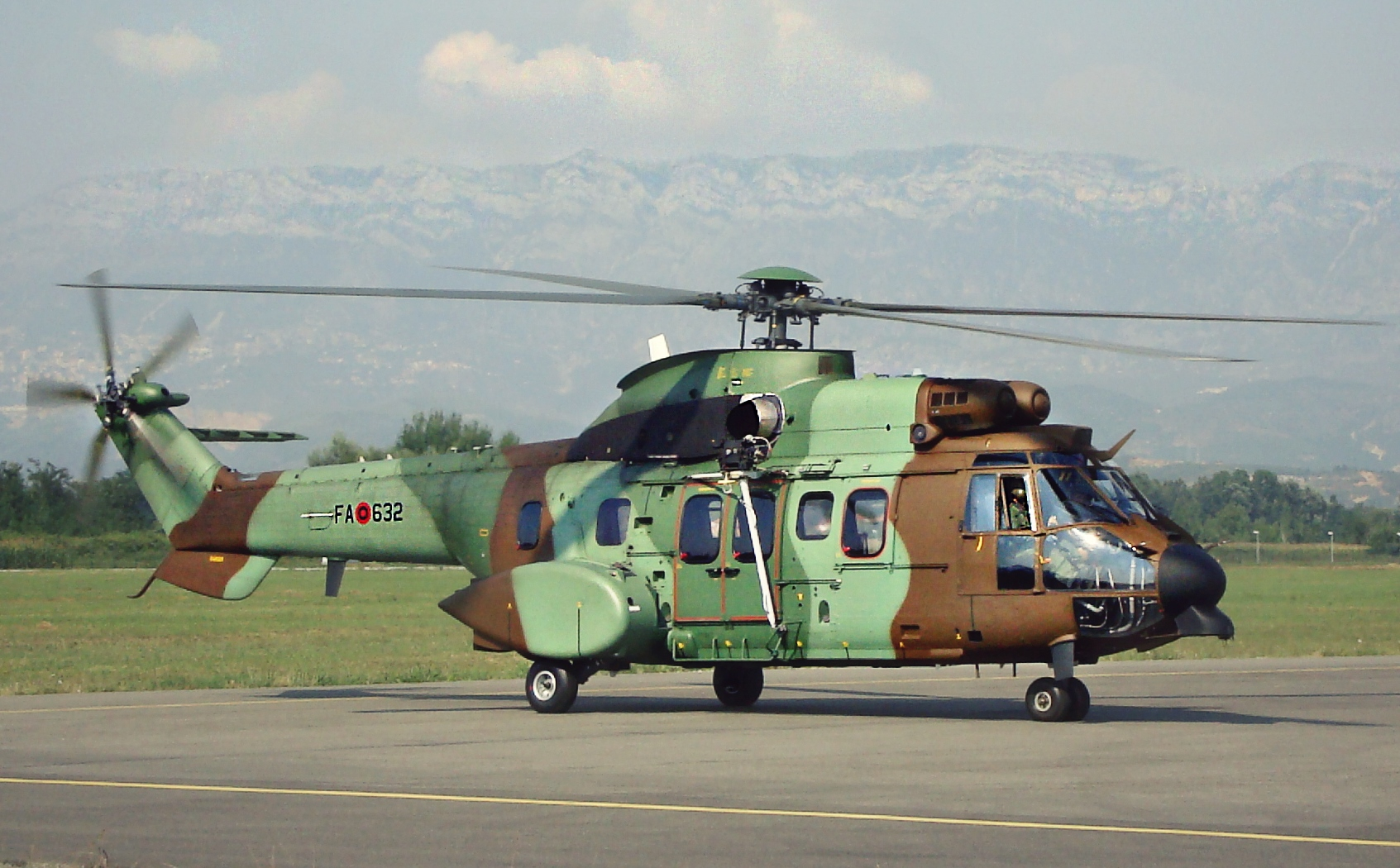
Air Force AS532 AL Cougar helicopter

- Albanian Air Force, in Tirana
  - Staff Support Company, in Tirana
  - Helicopter Squadron, at Farkë Air Base in Farkë
  - Support Squadron, at Kuçovë Air Base in Kuçovë
  - Unmanned Aircraft Detachment, at Kuçovë Air Base in Kuçovë with Bayraktar TB2
  - Ground-Based Air Defence Battalion
  - Air Surveillance Center, in Rinas reports to NATO Integrated Air Defense System's CAOC Torrejón at Torrejón Air Base in Spain
    - AN/TPS-77 radar on top of Mida mountain near Pukë
  - Military Meteorological Service, in Tirana
    - Automated weather stations in Farkë, Gjadër, Kuçovë, Kukës, Vlorë, and Gjirokastër

=== Naval Force ===
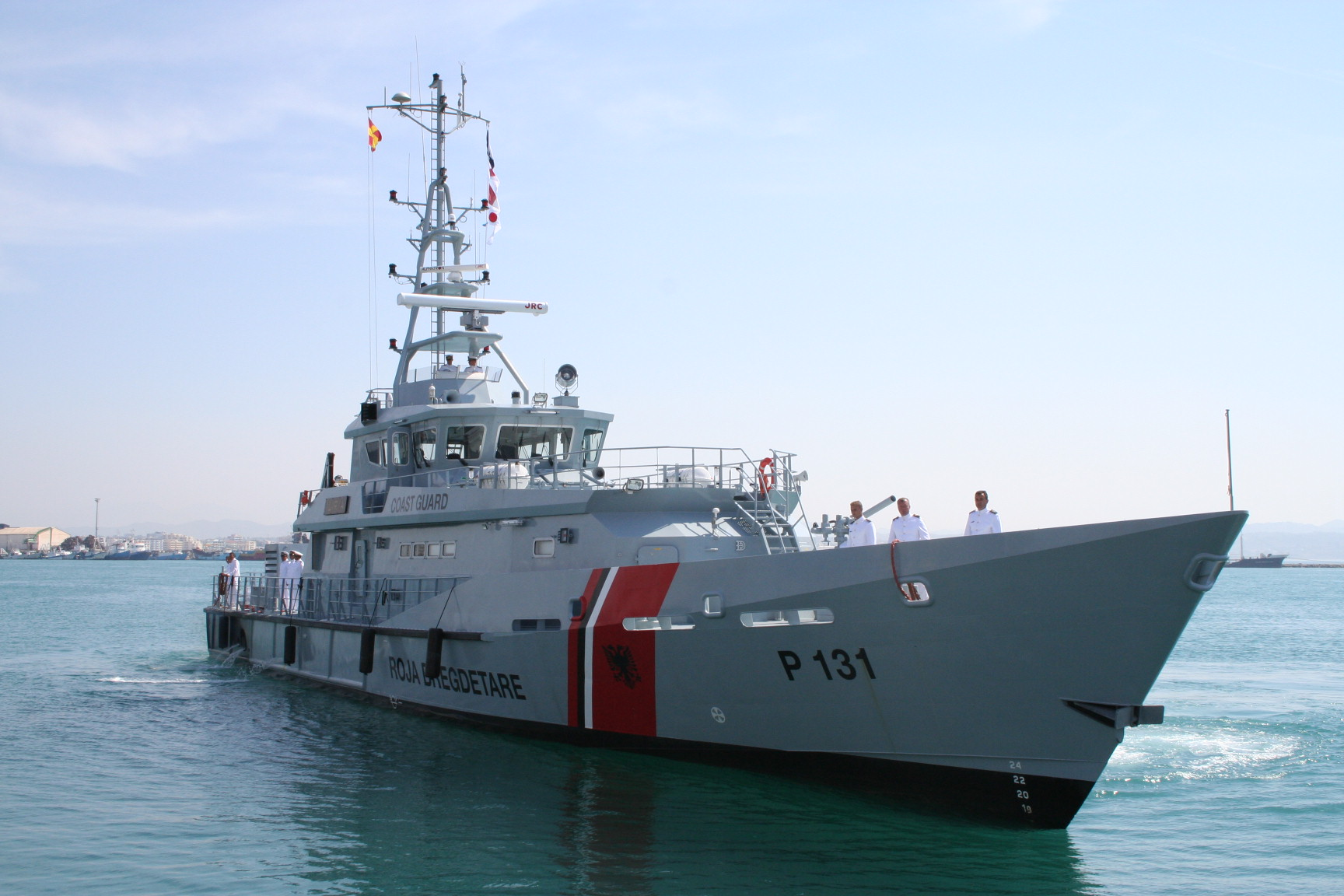
Naval Force P 131 Iliria patrol vessel

- Albanian Naval Force, in Durrës
  - Staff Support Company, in Durrës
  - Northern Naval District, at Kepi Palit in Durrës
    - Kepi Palit Naval Flotilla, at Kepi Palit Base
  - Southern Naval District, at Pasha Liman Base in Vlorë
    - Pasha Liman Naval Flotilla, at Pasha Liman Base in Vlorë
      - 4 × Stan 4207 patrol vessels: P 131 Iliria and P 133 Lisus in Durrës, P 132 Oriku and P 134 Butrinti
  - Maritime Surveillance Center, in Durrës
  - Diving Center, at Pasha Liman Base in Vlorë
  - Naval Basic Training Center, in Durrës
  - Hydrographic Service, in Durrës

=== Training and Doctrine Command ===
- Training and Doctrine Command, in Tirana
  - Armed Forces Academy, in Tirana
  - NCOs Academy, in Tirana
  - Troops School, in Vlorë
  - Simulation Center, in Tirana
  - Doctrine and Research Center, in Tirana

=== Support Command ===
- Support Command, in Vaqarr
  - Staff Support Company, in Vaqarr
  - Engineer Battalion, in Ferraj
    - Command and Staff
    - Construction Company
    - Explosive Ordnance Disposal Company
    - Bridge Company, Support Company
  - Supply Battalion, in Pezë Helmës
  - Transport Battalion, in Bregu i Lumit
  - Regional Support Battalion, in Tirana
  - Armed Forces Repair and Maintenance Center, in Vaqarr
  - Civil Emergencies and Support Base - BMEC
  - Mengel Regional Support Detachment with Reservists, in Mengel
  - Armed Forces Central Laboratory, in Ferraj
  - Training Center, in Sauk

=== Military Police ===
- Military Police, in Sauk
  - Criminal Police Section
  - Judicial Police Section
  - Military Discipline Section
  - Vehicle Traffic Inspectorate
  - Fire Protection Inspectorate
  - 1st Military Police Operations Company
  - 2nd Military Police Operations Company
  - 3rd Military Police Operations Company
  - Support Company

== Armed Forces organization graphic ==
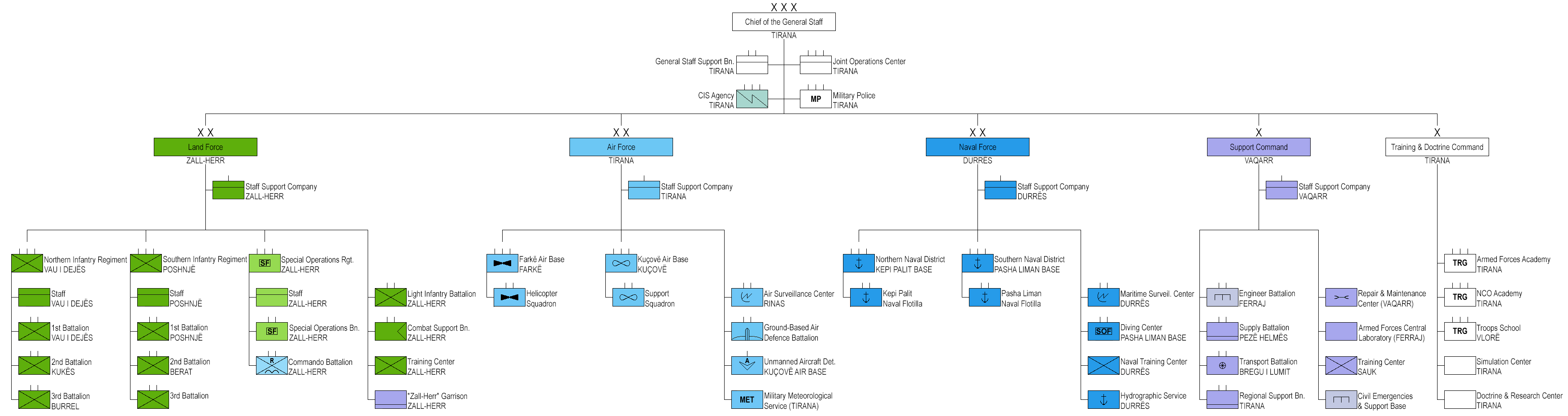
Albanian Armed Forces organization as of November 2025

== Geographic distribution of units ==
Albanian Armed Forces locations 2025
Land Force Naval Force Air Force Support Command Military Police
