= List of military unit mottoes by country =

== Albania ==
- Albanian Land Forces: (Fatherland, Honor, And Duty)
  - Group Light Infantry Battalion: Fortior, Perserverantie, Fidem (Latin for Stronger, Perseverance, Faith)
  - Commando Battalion (Albania): Commando lead the way
  - Special Operations Regiment (Albania): We better die for something than live for nothing

== Australia ==
- Australian Army
  - 1st Armoured Regiment: Paratus (Latin for "prepared")
  - 1st Commando Regiment: Strike swiftly
  - 1st/15th Royal New South Wales Lancers: Tenax in fide (Latin for "steadfast in faith")
  - 2nd Cavalry Regiment: Courage
  - 2nd Commando Regiment: Foras admonitio (Latin for "without warning")
  - 3rd/9th Light Horse (South Australian Mounted Rifles): Nec aspera terrent (Latin for "not afraid of difficulties")
  - 4th/19th Prince of Wales's Light Horse: Ich dien (German for "I serve")
  - 5th/6th Battalion, Royal Victoria Regiment: Nemo me impune lacessit (Latin for "no one provokes me with impunity") and semper paratus (Latin for "always ready")
  - 51st Battalion, Far North Queensland Regiment: Ducit amor patriae (Latin for "love of country leads me")
  - Royal Australian Artillery: Quo fas et gloria ducunt (Latin for "where right and glory lead")
  - Royal Australian Engineers: Ubique (Latin for "everywhere") and honi soit qui mal y pense (Old French for "evil be to him who evil thinks")
    - Special Operations Engineer Regiment: Inter hastas et hostes (Latin for "between spears and enemies")
  - Royal Australian Regiment: Duty first
  - Royal Queensland Regiment: Pro aris et focis (Latin for "for altars and hearths")
  - Royal Tasmania Regiment: Pro aris et focis (Latin for "for altars and hearths")
  - Special Air Service Regiment: Who dares wins
- Royal Australian Air Force: Per ardua ad astra (Latin for "through adversity to the stars")
  - No. 41 Wing: Pass not unseen
  - No. 42 Wing: Defend from above
  - No. 44 Wing: Steadfastness
  - No. 78 Wing: Fight
  - No. 81 Wing: Prepared to fight
  - No. 82 Wing: Find and destroy
  - No. 84 Wing: Guide and deliver
  - No. 86 Wing: Precision
  - No. 92 Wing: Watch and ward
  - No. 395 Wing: Expeditionary support
  - No. 396 Wing: Steadfast in support
- Royal Australian Navy: To fight and win at sea
  - Clearance Diving Branch: United and undaunted
  - Fleet Air Arm: Unrivalled
  - Submarine Service: Silent service

== Austria ==
- EKO Cobra: Semper melius (Latin for "Always better")
- Bundesheer (Austrian Army): Schutz und Hilfe (German for ''Protection and help'')
- Jägerbataillon 26: Kärntner allzeit voran (German for "Carinthians always ahead")
- Jagdkommando: Numquam retro (Latin for "Never back down")
- Jägerbataillon 25 Airborne: "Mutig Tapfer Treu" (German for "Brave Bravely Faithful")
- Jägerbataillon 23: In Treue fest (German for ''Steadfast in loyalty'')
- Jägerbataillon 18: Das Oberland- Fest in uns'rer Hand! (German for ''The Highlands- Firmly in our hand'')
- Pionierbataillon 3: Pioniere - wie immer (German for "Pioneers - like always")

== Brunei Darussalam ==
- Brunei Darussalam Commando Unit (RPK)
  - The Rejimen Pasukan Khas's motto is: "Tangkas Berani" or in English: "Agile and Brave"

== Bangladesh ==
- Bangladesh Armed Forces: Cira unnata mama śira (Bengali for "Ever High is My Head")
  - Bengali Army: Samarē āmarā śāntitē āmarā sarbatra āmarā dēśēra tarē (Bengali for "In War, In Peace We are Everywhere for our Country")
  - Bengali Navy: Śāntitē saṅgrāmē samudrē durjaẏa (Bengali for "In War and Peace Invincible at Sea")
  - Bengali Air Force: Bānlāra ākāśa rākhiba mukta (Bengali for "Free shall we keep the sky of Bengal")
  - Bengali Coast Guard: Sāgarē abhibhābaka (Bengali for "Guardian at Sea")

== Brazil ==
- Corpo de Fuzileiros Navais (Brazilian Marine Corps): Ad sumus (Latin for "here we are")
- Grupamento de Mergulhadores de Combate: (Brazilian Navy Combat Diver): Fortuna Audaces Sequitur (Latin for "luck follow the brave")
- 1º Batalhão de Ações de Comandos: (1° Commando Action Battalion):Maximo de confusão, morte e destruição na retaguarda do inimigo (Portuguese for " Maximum of confusion, death and destruction behind the enemy lines")
- 1º Batalhão de Forças Especiais: (1º Special Forces Battalion): O Ideal como Motivação; A Abnegação como Rotina; O Perigo como Irmão e A Morte como Companheira (Portuguese for " The Ideal as Motivation; Self-denial as routine; Danger as a Brother and Death as a Companion.")
- Batalhão de Operações Policiais Especiais (PMERJ): (Special Police Operations Battalion): Missão dada é missão cumprida (Portuguese for " A mission given is an accomplished mission")
- Comando de Operações Táticas: (Tactical Operations Command): Em qualquer hora, em qualquer lugar para qualquer missão (Portuguese for "At anytime, anywhere for any mission")

== Canada ==
- Canadian Army: Vigilamus pro te (Latin for "we stand on guard for thee")
  - Royal Regiment of Canadian Artillery: Quo fas et gloria ducunt (Latin for "where duty and glory lead") and ubique (Latin for "everywhere")
  - 1 Canadian Mechanized Brigade Group: Semper vigilans (Latin for "always vigilant")
    - Lord Strathcona's Horse (Royal Canadians): Perseverance
  - 2 Canadian Mechanized Brigade Group: Audacia et fortitudo (Latin for "strength and courage")
    - The Royal Canadian Dragoons: Audax et celer (Latin for "bold and swift")
    - The Royal Canadian Regiment: Pro patria (Latin for "for country")
  - 5 Canadian Mechanized Brigade Group: Allons-y (French for "let's go")
    - 12^{e} Régiment Blindé du Canada (12th Canadian Armoured Regiment): Adsum (Latin for "I am present")
    - Royal 22nd Regiment: Je me souviens (French for "I remember")
  - 31 Canadian Brigade Group: Pro aris et focis (Latin for "for hearth and home")
    - The Royal Canadian Regiment: Pro patria (Latin for "for country")
  - 32 Canadian Brigade Group: Steadfast
  - 33 Canadian Brigade Group: Fortes soli, fortiores una (Latin for "strong alone, stronger together")
  - 34 Canadian Brigade Group: Combattre, vaincre ou mourir (French for "fight, overcome or die")
    - Royal 22nd Regiment: Je me souviens (French for "I remember")
  - 35 Canadian Brigade Group: Honneur et Courage (French for "Honor and Courage")
  - 38 Canadian Brigade Group: Progredere ne regredere (Latin for "ever forward, never back")
  - 39 Canadian Brigade Group: Splendor sine occasu (Latin for "splendor without diminishment")
  - 41 Canadian Brigade Group: Fortune favours the bold
  - Hastings & Prince Edward Regiment: Paratus (Latin for "prepared")
- Royal Canadian Air Force: Sic itur ad astra (Latin for "such is the pathway to the stars")
- Royal Canadian Navy: Ready aye ready
- Canadian Joint Operations Command: Unanimi cum ratione (Latin for "united in purpose")
- Canadian Special Operations Forces Command: Viam inveniemus (Latin for "we will find a way")
  - 427 Special Operations Aviation Squadron: Ferte manus certas (Latin for "strike with a sure hand")
  - Canadian Joint Incident Response Unit: Nunquam non parati (Latin for "never unprepared")
  - Canadian Special Operations Regiment: Audeamus (Latin for "we dare")
  - Joint Task Force 2: Facta non verba (Latin for "deeds, not words")
  - The Corps of Royal Canadian Electrical and Mechanical Engineers (Le corps du genie electric et mécanique royal canadien):’’Arte Marte’’(Latin for “ by skill and by fighting” “Latin pour “Par l’adresse et le combat”)

== Chile ==
- Chilean Army: Siempre vencedor, jamás vencido (Spanish for "Always Victorious, Never Defeated")

== China, Republic of ==
Republic of China Armed Force

- 防衛固守，有效嚇阻(fang-wei-gu-shou, you-xiao-he-zu): persistent defense, effective intimidation.
- 決戰境外(jue-zhan-jing-wai): decisive battle outside of national boundary.
- Republic of China Army
  - Aviation and Special Operation Command
    - 高山低頭，海水讓路(gao-shan-di-tou, hai-shui-rang-lu): the mountain bows, the ocean gives way.
    - 生為空特人，死為空特魂(sheng-wei-kong-te-ren, si-wei-kong-te-hun): live as kon-teh persons, die as kon-teh spirits.(空特kon-teh is abbreviation of Aviation and Special Warfare Command)
- Republic of China Navy
  - 忠、義(zhong, yi): loyalty and justice.
  - 見敵必戰(jian-di-bi-zhan): we must battle when enemy is in sight.
  - Republic of China Marine Corps
    - 一日陸戰隊，終生陸戰隊(yi-ri-lu-zhan-dui, zhong-sheng-lu-zhan-dui): Once a marine, always a marine.
    - 不怕苦，不怕難，不怕死(bu-pa-ku, bu-pa-nan, bu-pa-si): fear no pain, fear no challenge, fear no death.
    - 永遠忠誠(yong-yuan-zhong-cheng): always faithful (taken from the USMC motto semper fidelis)
- Republic of China Air Force
  - 無空防即無國防(wu-kong-fang-ji-wu-guo-fang): without air defense there is no national defense.
- Republic of China Military Police
  - 忠貞憲兵(zhong-zheng-xian-bing): loyal military police.
- Military Academy
  - 親愛精誠: Fraternity, Devotion, Sincerity
  - 貪生怕死勿入此門，升官發財請走他路(tan-sheng-pa-si-mo-ru-ci-men, sheng-guan-fa-cai-qing-zou-ta-lu): (those who) covet life and fear death do not enter this door, (those who wish for) promotion and wealth please take other paths.

== Czech Republic ==
- 601st Special Forces Group: Dokud dýchám, doufám (As long as I breathe, I hope)
- 4th Rapid Deployment Brigade: Tam, kde jiní nestačí (Where others are not enough)
  - 43rd Parachute regiment: Pot šetří krev (Sweat saves blood)
- 72nd mechanized battalion: Statečně bojovat, svobodně žít! (Fight bravely, live freely!)
- 15th engineer regiment: Sloužíme, abychom pomáhali! (We serve to help!)
- 53rd reconnaissance and electronic warfare regiment: Kdo zná, vítězí/Sciens vincit (Who knows, wins)

== Estonia ==
- Maavägi (Estonian Army)
  - 2. jalaväebrigaad (2nd Infantry Brigade): Tehtud teisest terasest (Estonian for "Made of other steel")
  - Scoutspataljon (Scouts Battalion): E pluribus unum (Latin for "out of many, one")
- Merevägi (Estonian Navy): Mere kutsel – mere kaitsel! (In English as "Call of the Sea – Call to Defend")
- Õhuvägi (Estonian Air Force): Pro patria ad astra! (Latin for "For the Fatherland to the Stars!")

== Finland ==
- Maavoimat (Finnish Army)
  - Panssariprikaati (Armoured Brigade): Iske ja murra (Finnish for "strike and break through")
  - Karjalan prikaati (Karelia Brigade): Kaarti päälle! (Finnish for "Guard, charge upon them")
  - Kymen Jääkäripataljoona (Kymi Jaeger Battalion): Verta ja Terästä (Finnish for "Blood and Steel")
  - Porin Prikaati (Pori Brigade): Kunnia, velvollisuus, tahto (Finnish for "honour, duty, will")
  - Utin Jääkärirykmentti (Utti Jaeger Regiment): Excelsior (Latin for "higher")
- Ilmavoimat (Finnish Air Force): Qualitas potentia nostra (Latin for "quality is our strength")
- Suomen Kansainvälinen Valmiusjoukko (Finnish Rapid Deployment Force): Näytä hyvältä, tee hyvää! (Finnish for "look properly, do properly!")

== France ==
- Armée de Terre (French Army): Honneur et patrie (French for "honour and fatherland")
  - 1^{er} Régiment de hussards parachutistes (1st Parachute Hussar Regiment): Omnia si perdas, famam servare memento (Latin for "if you have lost everything, remember there is still honour")
  - 1^{er} Régiment de parachutistes d'infanterie de marine (1st Marine Infantry Parachute Regiment): Qui ose gagne (French for "who dares wins")
  - 2^{e} Régiment de parachutistes d'infanterie de marine (2nd Marine Infantry Parachute Regiment): Ne pas subir (French for "do not suffer")
  - 3^{e} Régiment de parachutistes d'infanterie de marine (3rd Marine Infantry Parachute Regiment): Être et durer (French for "to be and to last")
  - 2^{e} Régiment d'infanterie de marine (2nd Marine Infantry Regiment): Fidelitate et honore, terra et mare (Latin for "loyalty and honour on land and sea")
  - 3^{e} Régiment d'infanterie de marine (3rd Marine Infantry Regiment): Debout les morts (French for "The dead, get up")
  - 12^{e} Régiment de cuirassiers (12th Cuirassier Regiment): In periculo ludunt (Latin for "amidst danger, they play")
  - 2^{e} Régiment de dragons (2nd Dragoon Regiment): Da materiam splendescam (Latin for "give me a chance to shine")
  - 13^{e} Régiment de dragons parachutistes (13th Parachute Dragoon Regiment): Au-delà du possible (French for "Beyond what is possible")
  - 11^{e} Régiment d'artillerie de marine (11th Marine Artillery Regiment): Alter post fulmina terror (Latin for "the other terror after lightning")
  - 35^{e} Régiment d'artillerie parachutiste (35th Parachute Artillery Regiment): Droit devant (French for "Straight ahead")
  - Chasseurs alpins (Alpine Rangers): Jamais être pris vivant (French for "never to be taken alive") and sans peur et sans reproche (French for "Fearless and beyond reproach")
  - Franco-German Brigade: Dem Besten verpflichtet and le devoir d'excellence (German and French for "the Duty to excel")
  - Légion étrangère (French Foreign Legion): Legio patria nostra (Latin for "the legion is our fatherland")
    - 1^{er} Régiment étranger de cavalerie (1st Foreign Cavalry Regiment): Nec pluribus impar (Latin for "not unequal to many")
    - 1^{er} Régiment étranger de génie (1st Foreign Engineer Regiment): Ad unum (Latin for "to the end")
    - 2^{e} Régiment étranger de génie (2nd Foreign Engineer Regiment): Rien n'empêche (French for "nothing prevents")
    - 2^{e} Régiment étranger d'infanterie (2nd Foreign Infantry Regiment): Être prêt (French for "be ready")
    - 2^{e} Régiment étranger de parachutistes (2nd Foreign Parachute Regiment): More majorum (Latin for "after the custom of our ancestors")
- Marine nationale (French Navy): Honneur, patrie, valeur, discipline (French for "honour, fatherland, valour, discipline")
- Armée de l'air (French Air and Space Force): Faire face (French for "rise up")
- Grande Armée (Grand Army): Valeur et discipline (French for "valour and discipline")

== Germany ==
- Bundeswehr (German Armed Forces): Wir. Dienen. Deutschland. (German for "We. Serve. Germany.")
  - Heer (German Army): Schützen, helfen, vermitteln, kämpfen (German for "protect, help, moderate, fight")
    - 1. Panzerdivision (1st Panzer Division): Man drup, man to! (Low German for "Let's go, let's tackle it!")
      - Panzerbrigade 21 "Lipperland" (21st Panzer Brigade "Lipperland"): Für den Kampf bereit, um Frieden zu schaffen (German for "ready for battle, to make peace")
    - 10. Panzerdivision (10th Panzer Division): Zuverlässig, beweglich, schnell! (German for "reliable, mobile, fast!")
    - I. German/Dutch Corps: Communitate valemus (Latin for "together we are strong")
    - Division Spezielle Operationen (Special Operations Division): Einsatzbereit, jederzeit, weltweit! (German for "ready for action, anytime, worldwide!")
      - Fernspählehrkompanie 200 (Deep Reconnaissance Company 200): Oculus exercitus (Latin for "the eye of the army")
      - Kommando Spezialkräfte (Special Forces Command): Facit omnia voluntas (Latin for "the will decides")
    - Franco-German Brigade: Dem Besten verpflichtet and le devoir d'excellence (German and French for "devoted to excellence")
    - Heerestruppenbrigade (Army Troops Brigade): Viribus unitis (Latin for "combined strength")
    - Luftlandepioniere (Airborne Engineers): Wir bewegen alles (German for "we move everything")
    - Heeresfliegertruppe (Army Aviation Corps): Ohne Furcht – Nach vorn! (German for "without fear – forward!")
  - Deutsche Marine (German Navy)
    - Kampfschwimmer (Combat Swimmers): Lerne leiden ohne zu klagen! (German for "learn to suffer without complaining!")
  - Luftwaffe (German Air Force): Immer im Einsatz (German for "always on duty")
    - Objektschutzregiment der Luftwaffe "Friesland" (Protection Regiment of the Air Force "Friesland"): Semper communis (Latin for "always together")
  - Wachbataillon (Guard Battalion): Semper talis (Latin for "always the same")
  - Zentraler Sanitätsdienst der Bundeswehr (Joint Medical Service): Humanitas suprema lex (Latin for "humanity is the supreme law")

== Greece ==
- Ελληνικός Στρατός (Hellenic Army): Ἐλεύθερον τὸ Εὔψυχον (Greek for "freedom stems from valour") (Note: The phrase comes from Thucydides' History of the Peloponnesian War.)
  - 1η Στρατιά (First Army): Εστ' αν (ο ήλιος) την αυτήν οδόν ίη (Greek for "as long as (the sun) follows its course") (Note: Before the Battle of Plataea, Mardonius offered the Athenians peace terms, with the hope of dividing the Greek forces. The Athenians responded with "As long as the sun follows his course, as he does now, we shall not come to a compromise with Xerxes".)
    - Α' Σώμα Στρατού (I Army Corps): Μολών λαβέ (Greek for "come and get them") (Note: The phrase was uttered by the Spartan King Leonidas I, just prior to the Battle of Thermopylae, as a response to the Persian King Xerxes I's demand for the surrender of the Spartans' arms.)
    - Β' Σώμα Στρατού (II Army Corps): Ἢ τὰν ἢ ἐπὶ τᾶς (Ancient Greek for "either with it or on it") (Note: Spartan mothers would utter the phrase to their sons before they went to war, reminding them to return victorious with the shield, or be brought back dead upon it. Returning home without a shield meant the soldier deserted, since a hoplite could not escape the field of battle unless he tossed away the heavy and cumbersome shield.)
      - I Μεραρχία Πεζικού (1st Infantry Division): Αέρα (Greek for "(like the) wind") (Note: The phrase is the traditional battle cry of Greek infantrymen when attacking the enemy.)
        - 1η Ταξιαρχία Kαταδρομών-Αλεξιπτωτιστών (1st Raider/Paratrooper Brigade): Ο Tολμών Nικά (Greek for "who dares wins") (Note: The phrase is a tribute to the Sacred Band that fought during World War II alongside the Special Air Service, which also shares the motto.)
    - Δ' Σώμα Στρατού (IV Army Corps): Τώ ξιφεί τόν δεσμό λελύσθαι (Greek for "solve the knot with the sword") (Note: The phrase is a reference to the Gordian Knot, a legendary knot tied to a pole near the temple of Zeus in Gordium. It was prophesied that whoever loosed the knot would become ruler of all Asia. Alexander the Great solved the puzzle by slicing through the knot.)
    - Ελληνική Δύναμη Κύπρου (Hellenic Force in Cyprus): Το όμαιμόν τε και ομόγλωσσον και ομόθρησκον και ομότροπον (Greek for "the same blood and common language and common religion and common traditions")
- Πολεμικό Ναυτικό (Hellenic Navy): Μέγα το της θαλάσσης κράτος (Greek for "great is the power of the sea") (Note: The phrase comes from Thucydides' account of Pericles' oration on the eve of the Peloponnesian War.)
- Πολεμική Αεροπορία (Hellenic Air Force): Αἰὲν Ὑψικρατεῖν (Ancient Greek for "always dominate the heights")

== India ==
The mottoes of the Indian Armed Forces units come from Sanskrit or a regional language the specific unit is closely affiliated with. Some however are laurels won on the field and are in the language of the enemy or the commander's praise.

Military Unit	Motto	Language	Translation	War Cry	Translation
Indian Army	"Sewa Paramo Dharma"	Sanskrit	Service before self	"Bharat Mata ki jai"	"Victory to Mother India"
Indian Air Force	"Nabha sprsham deeptam"	Sanskrit	"Touch the sky with glory"	"Bharat Mata ki jai"	"Victory to Mother India"
Indian Navy	"Sham-no Varuna"	Sanskrit	"May the Lord of the oceans be auspicious unto us"	"Bharat Mata ki jai"	"Victory to Mother India"
Corps of Army Air Defence	"Aakasey satrun jahi"	Sanskrit	"Win over the enemy in the sky"		
Army Medical Corps	"Sarve santu niramaya"	Sanskrit	"Freedom from sickness to all"		
Military Nursing Service	"Service with smile"	English			
Regiment of Artillery	"Sarvatra izzat o iqbal"	Hindi/Urdu	"Everywhere with honour and glory"		
Brigade of The Guards	"Pahla hamesha pahla"	Hindi/Urdu	"First, always first"	"Garud ka hun bol pyare "	"I am the son of Garuda, Say O my friend"
Parachute Regiment	"Shatrujeet"	Hindi	"The conqueror"	"Balidaan parma dharam"	"Sacrifice is prime duty"
Mechanised Infantry Regiment	"Valour and Faith"	English		"Bolo Bharat Mata ki jai"	"Say Victory to Mother India"
Punjab Regiment	"Sthal wa jal"	Hindi	"By land and sea"	"Jo bole So Nihal, sat sri akal"; "Bol Jawala Ma ki jai"	"Shout Aloud in Ecstasy, True is the Great Eternal God"; "Say victory to Goddess Jawala"
Madras Regiment	"Swadharme nidhanam shreyaha"	Sanskrit	"It is a glory to die doing one's duty"	"Veera Madrasi, adi kollu, adi kollu"	"Brave Madrasi, hit and kill, hit and kill"
All Gorkha Rifles	"Kayar hunu bhanda marnu ramro"	Nepali	"Better to die than live like a coward"	"Jai Ma Kali, ayo Gorkhali"	"Hail Goddess Kali, here come the Gorkhas"
Maratha Light Infantry	"Kartavya, Maan, Saahas.	Marathi	Duty, Honour, Courage	"Bol Shri Chhatrapati Shivaji Maharaj ki jai"	"Say victory to King Shivaji Maharaj"
The Grenadiers	"Sarvada shaktishali"	Sanskrit	"Ever powerful"	"Sarvada Shaktishali"	"Ever powerful"
Rajputana Rifles	"Veer bhogya vasundhara"	Sanskrit	"The brave shall inherit the earth"	"Raja Ramachandra ki jai"	"Victory to King Ramachandra"
Rajput Regiment	"Sarvatra vijay"	Sanskrit	"Victory everywhere"	"Bol Bajrang Bali ki jai"	"Say victory to Lord Hanuman"
Jat Regiment	"Sangathan wa veerta"	Hindi	"Unity and valour"	"Jat Balwan, jai bhagwan"	"The Jat is strong, victory to God"
Sikh Regiment	"Nischey kar apni jeet karon"	Punjabi	"With determination, I will be triumphant"	"Jo bole So Nihal, sat sri akal"	"Shout Aloud in Ecstasy, True is the Great Eternal God"
Sikh Light Infantry	"Deg tegh fateh"	Punjabi	"Prosperity in peace and victory in war"	"Jo bole So Nihal, sat sri akal"	"Shout Aloud in Ecstasy, True is the Great Eternal God"
Dogra Regiment	"Kartavyam anvatma"	Sanskrit	"Duty before death"	"Jawala Mata ki jai"	"Victory to Goddess Jawala"
Defence Security Corps	"Raksha Tatha Surkasha"	Hindi	"Defence and Security"		
Kumaon Regiment	"Parakramo vijayate"	Sanskrit	"Valour triumphs"	"Kalika Mata ki jai"; "Bajrang Bali ki jai"; "Dada Kishan ki jai"	"Victory to Goddess Kali"; "Victory to Lord Hanuman"; "Victory to Dada Kishan"
Assam Regiment	"Assam vikram"		"Unique valour"	Rhino charge	
Bihar Regiment	"Karam hi dharam"	Hindi	"Work is worship"	"Jai Bajrang Bali"	"Victory to Lord Hanuman"
Mahar Regiment	"Yash sidhi"	Sanskrit	"Success and attainment"	"Bolo Hindusthan ki jai"	"Say victory to India"
Jammu & Kashmir Rifles	"Prashata ranvirta"	Sanskrit	"Valour in battle is praiseworthy"	"Durga Mata ki jai!"	"Victory to Goddess Durga!"
Jammu and Kashmir Light Infantry	"Balidanam vir lakshanam"	Sanskrit	"Sacrifice is a characteristic of the brave"	"Bharat Mata ki jai"	"Victory to Mother India"
Ladakh Scouts				"Ki ki so so Lhargyalo"	"Victory to God"
Ordnance Corps	"Shastra se shakti"	Hindi	"Strength through weapons"		
The Corps of Signals	"Teevra chaukas"	Hindi	"Swift and secure"		
Corps of Engineers	"Sarvatra"	Sanskrit	"Everywhere"		
Indian Coast Guard	"Vayam rakshamah"	Sanskrit	"We protect"	"Bharat Mata ki jai"	"Victory to Mother India"
Territorial Army	"Savdhani Va Shoorta"	Hindi	"Precaution and Precision"	"Jai Shri Ram"	"Glory to Lord Rama"
Border Roads Organisation	"Shramena Sarvam Sadhyam"	Sanskrit	"Everything is achievable through Hardwork"		
Border Security Force	"Jeevan Prayatna Kartavya"	Sanskrit	"Duty unto death"	"Bharat Mata ki jai"	"Victory to Mother India"
Central Reserve Police Force	"Seva aur Nishtaa"	Hindi	"Service and Loyalty"	"CRPF Sada Ajey, Bharat Mata ki Jai"	"CRPF always invincible, Hail to Mother India"
Central Industrial Security Force	"Sanrakshan evam Suraksha"	Hindi	"Protection and Security"		
Indo-Tibetan Border Police	"Shaurya – Dridhata – KarmNishtha"	Hindi	"Valour – Steadfastness – Commitment"		
Sashastra Seema Bal	"Seva - Suraksha - Bandhutva"	Hindi	"Service, Security and Brotherhood"		
National Security Guard	"Sarvartra Sarvottam Suraksha"	Sanskrit	"Omnipresent Omnipotent Security"	"Bharat Mata ki jai"	"Victory to Mother India"
Assam Rifles	"Kartavyam Sarvottam"	Sanskrit	"Duty is Supreme"	"Bharat Mata ki jai"	"Victory to Mother India"

== Indonesia ==
Units within the Indonesian National Armed Forces have mottoes taken from Sanskrit, Old Javanese, and Indonesian language.

Military Unit	Motto	Language	Translation	Notes
Indonesian National Armed Forces	"Tri Dharma Eka Karma"	Sanskrit	Three duties, one action	
Indonesian Army	"Kartika Eka Paksi"	Sanskrit	literal-Kartika has only one bird meaning-Strength, Unity, Loyalty	
Indonesian Navy	"Jalesveva Jayamahe"	Sanskrit	"On The Sea We Are Glorious"	
Indonesian Air Force	"Swa Bhuwana Paksa"	Sanskrit	"Wings of The Motherland"	
Presidential Security Force of Indonesia	"Setia Waspada"	Indonesian	"loyal and vigilant"	
Indonesian Fleet Command	"Ekapada Banda Jala Nusa"	Sanskrit	"Uniting the Nusantara's Sea Powers"	
National Air Operations Command	"Labda Reswara Antarikshe"	Sanskrit	The mighty conquer the sky	Previously: National Air Defense Command: Labda Prakasa Nirwikara. Motto language: Sanskrit
Indonesian National Joint Defense Area Command I	"Tri Dharma Yudha Sakti"	Sanskrit	Three duties in the age of power	
Indonesian National Armed Forces Center for Mental Development	"Pinaka Baladhika Utama"	Sanskrit		
Indonesian National Armed Forces Center for Historical Affairs	"Senakattha"	Sanskrit		
Indonesian National Armed Forces Center for Strategic Assessment	"Niti Siasat Dharma Nagari"	Sanskrit		
Indonesian National Armed Forces Academy	"Bhineka Eka Bhakti"	Sanskrit		
Army
I "Bukit Barisan" Military Region Command	"Patah Tumbuh Hilang Berganti"	Malay	"There will be a replacement for everything"	
II "Sriwijaya" Military Region Command	"Pengabdian Tiada Henti"	Indonesian	"Endless Dedication"	
III "Siliwangi" Military Region Command	"Esa Hilang, Dua Terbilang"	Indonesian	"Either vanished or be excels"	
IV "Diponegoro" Military Region Command	"Sirnaning Yakso Katon Gapuraning Ratu"	Javanese	"Evil vanishes in front of the truth, and happiness will be achieved"	
V "Brawijaya" Military Region Command	"Bhirawa Anoraga"		"Gallant yet humble"	
VI "Mulawarman" Military Region Command	"Gawi Manuntung Waja Sampai Kaputing"	Banjarese	"Do it until it's done"	
IX "Udayana" Military Region Command	"Praja Raksaka"	Sanskrit	"Defender and protector of the people"	
XII "Tanjungpura" Military Region Command	"Carathana Jita Vina"	Sanskrit	"Never step back after a step forward"	
XIII "Merdeka" Military Region Command	"Jaya Sakti"	Sanskrit	"Victorious and Powerful"	
XIV "Hasanuddin" Military Region Command	"Setia Hingga Akhir"	Indonesian	"Loyal till the Last"	
XVI "Pattimura" Military Region Command	"Lawamena Haulala"		"Onward till the last drop of blood"	
XVII "Cenderawasih" Military Region Command	"Ksatria Pelindung Rakyat"	Indonesian	"Knight protectors of the people"	Previously: Praja Ghupta Vira. Motto language: Sanskrit
XVIII "Kasuari" Military Region Command	"Patriot Pembela Rakyat"	Indonesian	"Patriot defender of the people"	
Jayakarta Military Region Command	"Aneka Daya Tunggal Bhakti"		"Various Powers, One Devotion"	
Iskandar Muda Military Region Command	"Sanggamara"		"Ward off the havoc"	
Army Infantry	"Yuddha Wastu Pramukha"	Sanskrit	The Foremost Warfare Equipment	
Field Artillery	"Tri Sandhya Yudha"	Sanskrit	Soldier's Ability to Carry Out Their Duties without Knowing the Time	
Air Defense Artillery	"Vyati Rakca Bhala Chakti"	Sanskrit	The Great Soldier, Guardian of The Sky	
Cavalry	"Tri Daya Chakti"	Sanskrit	"Three Sacred Powers"	Referring to the Moving Power, Firing Power and Surprising Power of modern cavalry
Army Aviation	"Wira Amur"	Old Javanese	"Flying Soldiers"	
Army Military Police	"Satya Vira Wichaksana"	Sanskrit	"Loyal and Wise Knights"	
Corps of Engineers	"Yudha Karya Satya Bhakti"	Sanskrit	"Faithful in Battles and Developments"	
Signal Corps	"Chighra Apta Nirbhaya"	Sanskrit	"Fast, Exact, Secure"	
Psychological Corps	"Upakriya Labdha Prayojana Balottama"	Sanskrit	"Purpose of The Unit is to Give The Best Service to The Nation by Finding The Perfect Soldier"	
Ordnance Corps	"Dwi Chakti Bhakti"	Sanskrit		
Topography Corps	"Likita Bhutalayuddha Karya"	Sanskrit		
Medical Corps	"Hesti Wira Shakti"	Sanskrit		
Army Research and Development Corps	"Satiti Chakti Bhakti"	Sanskrit	"Make a Great Power for Serving The Nation"	
Army Strategic Reserve Command	"Dharma Putra"	Sanskrit	"The children of Dharma"	
Kostrad 1st Infantry Division	"Prakasa Vira Gupti"	Sanskrit	"Courageous, Gallant, Unseen"	
Kostrad 2nd Infantry Division	"Vira Chakti Yudha"	Sanskrit	"Graced warrior at battlefield"	
18th Para Raider Infantry Brigade/Trisula	"Sarvatra Eva Yudha"	Sanskrit	"Can fight anywhere, in any weather and direction"	
Kostrad 3rd Infantry Division	"Darpa Cakti Yudha"	Sanskrit	"Bold and graced at battlefield"	
Army Raider infantry	"Cepat, Tepat, Senyap"	Indonesian	"Fast, Exact, Quiet"	
Army Special Forces Command	"Tribhuana Chandraca Satya Dharma"	Sanskrit	"Fast, Exact, Quiet"	Popular motto: ''Berani, Benar, Berhasil ("Brave, Right, Successful"), motto language: Indonesian
Special Forces Education and Training Centre (Pusdiklatpassus)	"Tri Yudha Sakti"	Sanskrit	"The three abilities that a warrior should attain"	Refers to land, sea and air
1st Group - Para Commandos	"Eka Wastu Baladhika"	Sanskrit		
2nd Group - Para Commandos	"Dwi Dharma Birawa Yudha"	Sanskrit		
3rd Group - Clandestine	"Kottaman Wira Naracha Byuha"	Sanskrit		
SAT-81/Gultor - Counter-terrorism unit of Kopassus	"Siap Setia Berani"	Indonesian	"Ready, Loyal, Brave"	
Indonesian Military Academy	"Adhitakarya Mahatvavirya Nagarabhakti"	Sanskrit	"Hard-working Knights Serving Bravery as nation Hero"	
Navy
Indonesian Navy and Fleet Forces Corps	"Jalasveva Jayamahe"	Sanskrit	"On The Sea We Are Glorious"	
Indonesian Marine Corps	"Jalesu Bhumyamcha Jayamahe"	Sanskrit	"Glorious on the Land and the Sea"	
Taifib	"Mayanetra Yamadipati"	Sanskrit	"The invisible God of Death"	
Kopaska	"Tan Hana Wighna Tan Sirna"	Old Javanese	"No Difficulties Cannot be Conquered"	
Denjaka	"Satya Wira Dharma"	Sanskrit	"Ready to act against any threat of danger"	
Navy Submarine Unit	"Wira Ananta Rudira"	Sanskrit	"Steadfast until The End"	
Navy Amphibious Ships Unit	"Dwi Daya Yudha"	Sanskrit	"Two Powers in Battles"	Refers to the land and sea abilities of amphibious vehicles
Navy Military Police	"Wijna Wira Widhayaka"	Sanskrit	"Knightful and Wise Rule Upholders"	
Naval Hydro-oceanographic Service	"Jala Citra Praja Yodha"	Sanskrit	"Mapping The Sea for Nations' Glory"	
KRI Sultan Hasanuddin-366, a Sigma-class design corvette bought from the Netherlands	"Bertempur dan Menang"	Indonesian	"Fight and Win"	
Indonesian Naval Academy	"Hree Dharma Shanty"	Sanskrit	"Embarrassed for Doing The Defects"	
Air Force
Kopasgat	"Karmanye Vadikaraste Mafalesu Kadatjana"	Sanskrit	"Working without counting gains and losses"	Taken from the Bhagavad Gita 2:47
Kopasgat Education and Training Centre (Pusdiklat Paskhas)	"Samapta Vidya Cakti"	Sanskrit	"Preparing for knowledge and attain more capabilities"	
Bravo Detachment 90	"Catya Wihikan Awacyama Kapala"	Sanskrit	"Loyal, Skilled, Successful"	
Air Force Military Police	"Wira Waskita"	Sanskrit	"Skilled and Alerted Knights"	
Air Force Maintenance Command	"Sevana Karya Buddhi Sakti"	Sanskrit		
Air Force Command and Staff College	"Pragnya Paramartha Jaya"	Sanskrit		
Air Force Doctrine, Education and Training Development Command	"Vidyasana Viveka Vardhana"	Sanskrit		
1st Air Squadron	"Akasa Waskita Dwi Matra Vidya"	Sanskrit		
2nd Air Squadron	"Pengabdian Pantang Surut"	Indonesian	"Unwavering Devotion"	
3rd Air Squadron	"Uruvikrama Ghataka"	Sanskrit	"Valiant and Deadly"	
4th Air Squadron	"Apnute Kriya Hayu Uliha"	Sanskrit	"Execute the Mission with Excellence"	
5th Air Squadron	"Adhirajasa Bumantara Bhaya Kara Samudra"	Sanskrit	"Conquering the Sky Guarding the Ocean"	
6th Air Squadron	"Satya Anggakara Anjali"	Sanskrit	"Integrity, Courage, and Devotion"	
7th Air Squadron				
8th Air Squadron	"Cipta Sila Sancaya Dharma"	Sanskrit	"Continuously Evolving in the Execution of Duty"	
11th Air Squadron	"Bajra Garda Bhuwana"	Sanskrit	"The Thunder That Guards the Realm"	
12th Air Squadron	"Labda Gagana Nirwesti"	Sanskrit	"Find, Dominate, Destroy"	
14th Air Squadron	"Akasha Parakrama"	Sanskrit	"Swift, Gallant, Triumphant"	
15th Air Squadron	"Wiyakti Mandala Bhakti"	Sanskrit	"Dare to Defy the Odds"	
16th Air Squadron	"Vijayakantaka Abhyasti Virayate"	Sanskrit	"Excel and Valiant"	
17th Air Squadron	"Vimana Indra Paramartha"	English	"The Finest Conveyance of Kings"	
21st Air Squadron	"Antar Patangga Labdajaya"	Sanskrit	"To Fight and Fly for Victory"	
27th Air Squadron	"Aksi Varutha Pracya Antariksa"	Sanskrit	"Rapid Action in the Defense of the Skies"	
31st Air Squadron	"Ksatria Abhimana Anuraga"	Indonesian	"Prestige in Service, Humility in Spirit"	
32nd Air Squadron	"Swadhyayajnana Anuraga Bhakti Nagara"	Sanskrit	"Knowledge, Devotion, and Service to the Nation"	
33rd Air Squadron	"Nirwikara Adarma Nagara"	Sanskrit	"Unwavering Duty to the Nation"	
45th Air Squadron	"Swandana Ahingani"	Sanskrit	"Loyal in Service, Devoted in Protection"	
51st Air Squadron	"Jaya Aksi Angkasa"			
52nd Air Squadron	"Sakti Angkasa"			
Indonesian Air Force Academy	"Vidya Karma Vira Pakca"	Sanskrit	"Knowledge for deeds, Chivalrous to protect"	

== Israel ==
- Israel Defense Forces
  - Bahad 1: מִמֶּנִּי תִרְאוּ וְכֵן תַּעֲשׂוּ Mimeni tir'u wechen ta'asu (Watch me and do likewise.) (Judges 7:17)).
  - Duvdevan: כי בתחבולות תעשה לך מלחמה Ki b'Tahbulot, Ta'ase-l'kha milhama (For by wise counsel thou shalt make thy war (Proverbs 24:6)).
  - Givati Brigade: יחידת סגולה Yehidat Sgula (A Unit of Virtue, also means: purple - the brigade's beret color)
  - Israeli Armored Corps: האדם שבטנק ינצח Ha-Adam She-ba-Tank Yenatze'ah (The Man in the Tank Shall Win)
  - Israeli Armored Corps: במקום בו יעצרו הזחלים שמה ייקבע הגבול Ba-makom bo ya'atsru ha-zchalim, shama yikava ha gvool (In the Place where the [tank] Treads Stop, There the Border Will Be Decided [marked/drawn])
  - Israeli Artillery Corps: Bli Siyua, Ha-chir Lo Yanua (Without Support, the Infantry Won't Move)
  - Israeli Artillery Corps: ארטילריה מלכת הקרב artilerya malkat Hakrav (Artillery is the Queen of Battle)
  - Israeli Engineering Corps: ראשונים תמיד Rishonim Tamid (Always First)
  - Israeli Engineering Corps Chemical Warfare Unit: הישרדות והמשך לחימה Hisardut ve Hemsech Lechima (Survival and continuous combat)
  - Israeli Engineering Corps: את הקשה נעשה היום, את הבלתי אפשרי נעשה מחר Et ha-Kashe Naase Hayom, Et ha-Bilti Efshari Naase Machar (The hard we shall do today, the impossible we shall do tomorrow)
  - Israeli Education and Youth Corps: עם בונה צבא בונה עם Am boneh Tzava Boneh Am (A Folk builds An Army building a Folk)
  - Israeli Intelligence Corps: לך דומיה תהילה Lecha Dumiya Tehila (Silence is praise to You; Psalms 65:2)
  - Israeli Medical Corps: המציל נפש אחת כאילו הציל עולם שלם Ha-matsil nefesh achat, keilu hitsil olam shalem (He who saves one soul, it is as if he saves a whole world)
  - Israeli Navy: ויירד מים עד ים, ןמנהר עד אפסי ארץ, לפניו יכרעו ציים Vayerd MeYam Ad Yam, Uminahar Ad Afsey Aretz, Lefanav Yichreu Tziyim (He shall have dominion also from sea to sea, and from the river unto the ends of the earth. Navies shall bow before him; Psalm 72:8,9)
  - Nahal Brigade: היתרון האנושי HaYitaron ha-Enoshi (The Human Advantage)
  - Paratroopers Brigade: ניזום, נוביל, נהווה דוגמא, וננצח! Nizom, Novil, Ne'haveh Dugma VeNenaze'ah (We shall Innovate, Lead, Set an Example - and Win)
  - Sayeret Matkal (General Staff Reconnaissance Unit): מי שמעז מנצח Mi Sheme'ez, Menatze'ah (Who Dares Wins)
  - Shayetet 13: כשהגלים מתחזקים החזקים מתגלים She'hagalim mitchazkim, hachazakim mitgalim (When the waves grow stronger, the strong men are revealed).
- Mossad: באין תחבולות יפול עם, ותשועה ברוב יועץ Be'ein Tachbulot Yipol Am, Uteshua Berov Yoetz (Where no counsel is, the people fall, but in the multitude of counselors there is safety; Proverbs 11:14)
- Shabak: מגן ולא יראה Magen Ve-Lo Yira'e (Defender Who Shall Not Have Fear / Defender Who Shall Not Be Seen)

== Italy ==
- Esercito Italiano (Italian Army): Salus rei publicae suprema lex esto (Latin for "the safeguard of the republic shall be the supreme law")
  - Brigata Corazzata Ariete (Armoured Brigade Ariete): Ferrea mole, ferreo cuore (Italian for "iron mass, iron heart")
  - Brigata Meccanizzata Sassari (Mechanised Brigade Sassari): Sa vida pro sa patria (Sardinian for "our life for the fatherland")
- Marina Militare (Italian Navy): Patria e onore (Italian for "country and honour")
  - Brigata San Marco (Brigade of Saint Mark): Per mare, per terram (Latin for "by sea, by land")
  - Guardia Costiera (Coast Guard): Omnia vincit animus (Latin for "fortitude overcomes all difficulties")
- Aeronautica Militare (Italian Air Force): Virtute siderum tenus (Latin for "with valour to the stars")
- Arma dei Carabinieri (Corps of Carabiniers): Nei secoli fedele (Italian for "faithful throughout the centuries")
  - Reggimento Corazzieri (Regiment of Cuirassiers): Virtus in periculis firmior (Latin for "courage becomes stronger in danger")
- Guardia di Finanza (Financial Guard): Nec recisa recedit (Latin for "does not retreat even if broken")
- Polizia di Stato (State Police): Sub lege libertas (Latin for "under the law, freedom")
- Polizia Penitenziaria (Penitentiary Police): Despondere spem munus nostrum (Latin for "to ensure hope is our role")
- Corpo Forestale dello Stato (State Forestry Corps): Pro natura opus et vigilantia (Latin for "labour and vigilance for nature")
- Vigili del Fuoco (Fire Service): Flammas domamus donamus cordem (Latin for "we tame the flames, we give our hearts)
- Corpo Militare della Croce Rossa Italiana (Military Corps of the Italian Red Cross): Inter arma caritas (Latin for "in war, charity")
- Corpo Militare dell'Esercito dell'Associazione dei Cavalieri Italiani del Sovrano Militare Ordine di Malta (Military Corps of the Army of the Association of Italian Knights of the Sovereign Military Order of Malta): Fortitudo et sanitas (Latin for "strength and health")
- Corpo delle Infermiere Volontarie dell'Associazione dei Cavalieri Italiani del Sovrano Militare Ordine di Malta (Corps of Voluntary Nurses of the Association of Italian Knights of the Sovereign Military Order of Malta): Fortitudo et sanitas (Latin for "strength and health")
- Ordinariato Militare in Italia (Military Ordinariate in Italy): Fides, charitas, spes (Latin for "faith, charity, hope")

== Korea, South ==
Korean Army: Power in Unity

- 3rd Infantry Division "White skull" : 살아도 백골, 죽어도 백골 (We are white skull. Dead or Alive)
- Special Warfare Command 특수전사령부 : 안되면 되게하라 (Make the impossible possible)

== Lebanon ==
- Lebanese Army: شرف تضحية وفاء Sharaf Tadhiya Wafaa (Honor, Sacrifice, Loyalty)

== Malaysia ==
Malaysian Army: Gagah Setia (Strong and Loyal)

- Royal Malay Regiment: Ta'at Setia (Loyal and True)

Royal Ranger Regiment: Agi Idup Agi Ngelaban (Whilst there is life, there is fight)

- 1st Rangers
- 2nd Rangers: Osiou oh Kamanang (Who Dares Wins in Kadazan).
- 3rd Rangers: Biar Putih Tulang (Death Before Dishonour).
- 4th Rangers: Jadi Yang Terbaik (Be The Best).
- 5th Rangers
- 6th Rangers
- 7th Rangers (Mechanized): Cekal Perkasa (Determined and Strong)
- 8th Rangers (Para): Anang Skali Ngalah (Never Give Up in Iban).
- 9th Rangers: Siau Bani Manang (Who Dares Wins in Bajau)
- 10th Rangers

Note: The 1st, 5th, 6th and 10th Rangers uses the same motto, which is Agi Idup Agi Ngelaban.

Rejimen Sempadan (Border Regiment): Setia Waspada (Loyal and Alert)

Rejimen Artileri Diraja (Royal Artillery Regiment): Tangkas, Tegas, Saksama (Quick, Firm, Even)

Rejimen Semboyan Diraja (Royal Signs Regiment): Pantas dan Pasti (Swift and Sure)

Kor Agama Angkatan Tentera (Religious Corps of the Armed Forces of Malaysia): Berjuang Berakhlak

Kor Armor DiRaja (Royal Armored Corps): Bersatu (United)

Kor Risik DiRaja (Royal Intelligence Corps): Pintar dan Cergas (Intelligent and Active)

Royal Malaysian Navy:Sedia Berkorban (Ready to Sacrifice)

- Pasukan Khas Laut (PASKAL): Sentiasa Terbaik (Always The Best).

Royal Malaysian Air Force: Sentiasa di Angkasa Raya (Always in the Skies)

- Pasukan Khas Udara (PASKAU): Cepat, Senyap, Pasti

== Myanmar ==
Defence Service ["Never Surrender"]

== Netherlands ==
- Koninklijke Landmacht (Royal Netherlands Army)
  - I. German/Dutch Corps: Communitate valemus (Latin for "together we are strong")
  - 11 Luchtmobiele Brigade (11 Air Assault Brigade): Nec temere, nec timide (Latin for "neither rashly nor timidly")
    - 11 Luchtverdedigingscompagnie Samarinda (11 Air Defence Company Samarinda): Untuk keamanan saya yang atur (Indonesian for "we stand for protection")
    - 11 Garderegiment Grenadiers en Jagers (11 Guards Regiment Grenadiers and Rifles): Grenadiers vooraan! (Dutch for "grenadiers in front!") and allez chasse! (French for "let's hunt!")
    - 12 Regiment van Heutsz (12 Regiment van Heutsz): Het moet, dus het kan (Dutch for "it must, so it is possible")
    - 13 Regiment Stoottroepen Prins Bernhard (13 Regiment Shock Troops Prince Bernhard): Sterk uit overtuiging (Dutch for "strong by conviction")
  - 17 Garderegiment Fuseliers Prinses Irene (17 Guards Regiment Fusiliers Princess Irene): Volo et valeo (Latin for "I want it and I can do it")
  - Korps Commandotroepen (Commando Corps): Nunc aut nunquam (Latin for "now or never")
- Koninklijke Marine (Royal Netherlands Navy)
  - Korps Mariniers (Netherlands Marine Corps): Qua patet orbis (Latin for "as far as the world extends")
    - M-Squadron: Semper paratus pro justitia (Latin for "always ready for justice")
- Koninklijke Luchtmacht (Royal Netherlands Air Force): Parvus numero, magnus merito (Latin for "small in numbers, great in deeds")
  - 303 Squadron: Servans in periculo (Latin for "serving in danger")
  - 322 Squadron: Niet praten, maar doen (Dutch for "don't talk, but do")
  - 334 Squadron: Semper et ubique (Latin for "always and everywhere")
  - 313 Squadron: Scherpgetand (Dutch for ''Sharp-toothed)
- Koninklijke Marechaussee (Royal Military Constabulary): Zonder vrees en zonder blaam (Dutch for "without fear and without dishonour")

== New Zealand ==
- New Zealand Army

Military Unit	Motto	Language	Translation	Comments
1 (New Zealand) Brigade	Kia Rite Kia Takatu	Māori	Ready to act	
New Zealand Corps of Officer Cadets	Serve Proudly Lead Wisely	English		
Royal Regiment of New Zealand Artillery	Ubique	Latin	Everywhere	
The Corps of Royal New Zealand Engineers	Ubique	Latin	Everywhere	
Queen Alexandra's Mounted Rifles	Ake Ake Kia Kaha	Māori	Forever and ever be strong	
Royal New Zealand Corps of Signals	Certa Cito	Latin	Swift and Sure	
Royal New Zealand Infantry Regiment	Onward	English		
The New Zealand Special Air Service	Who Dares Wins	English		
Royal New Zealand Army Logistic Regiment	Ma Nga Hua Tu-Tangata	Māori	By our actions we are known	
Royal New Zealand Army Medical Corps	Semper Agens - Semper Quietus	Latin	Always alert, always calm	
Royal New Zealand Dental Corps	Ex Malo Bonum	Latin	From evil comes good	
Royal New Zealand Chaplains Department	In This Sign Conquer	English		
New Zealand Army Legal Service	Justitia in Armis	Latin	Justice in Arms	
The Corps of Royal New Zealand Military Police	Ko Tatou Hei Tauira	Māori	By example we lead	
New Zealand Army Physical Training Corps	Mens Sana In Corpore Sano	Latin	A sound mind in a sound body	
2nd/1st Battalion, RNZIR	Kura Takahi Puni	Māori	We are ready	
New Zealand Army Command School	Serve proudly, Lead Wisely	English		
New Zealand Army Adventurous Training Centre	Fortior Qui Se Vincit	Latin	He is stronger who conquers himself	
New Zealand Rifle Brigade	Soyes Ferme	Latin	Stand Fast	Disestablished
2nd New Zealand Expeditionary Force	Onward	English		Disestablished
The Home Guard	Kia Matara	Māori	On Guard	Disestablished
2nd Land Force Group	Parum Ad Agere	Latin	Ready to act	Disestablished
New Zealand Corps of Signals	Celeritas	Latin	Swiftly	Disestablished
New Zealand Cycle and Signaling Corps	Sodales Parati	Latin	Prepared as comrades together	Disestablished
New Zealand Dental Corps	Ex Malo Bonum	Latin	From evil comes good	Disestablished
New Zealand Post and Telegraph Corps	Celeritas	Latin	Swiftly	Disestablished
New Zealand Signal Corps	Sodales Parati	Latin	Prepared as comrades together	Disestablished
New Zealand Railway Corps	Gardez Bien	French	Guard well	Disestablished
New Zealand Tunnellers Corps	inga wahi katoa	Māori	Everywhere	Disestablished
New Zealand Woman's Royal Army Corps	Pro Patria	Latin	For Country	Disestablished 1978
Royal New Zealand Army Service Corps	Nil SineLabore	Latin	Nothing without work	Disestablished 1978
Royal New Zealand Army Ordnance Corps	Sua Tele Tonanti	Latin	To the warrior his arms	Disestablished 1996
Royal New Zealand Corps of Transport	Nil Sine Labore	Latin	Nothing without work	Disestablished 1996
Royal New Zealand Provost Corps	ko tatou hei tauira	Māori	We serve as examples	Disestablished
Royal New Zealand Electrical and Mechanical Engineers	Arte Et Marte	Latin	By skill and fighting	Disestablished 1996
1st Mounted Rifles (Canterbury Yeomanry Cavalry)	Celer Et Audax	Latin	Swift and Bold	Disestablished
1st Armoured Car Regiment (NZ Scottish)	No Rich Mo Dhuthaich	Scottish Gaelic	My King and Country	Disestablished
1st Battalion, Auckland Infantry (Countess of Ranfurly's Own)	Sisit Prudentia	Latin	Ever Prudent	Disestablished
1st Canterbury Rifle Battalion	Pro Aris Et Focus	Latin	For hearth and home	Disestablished
1st (Canterbury) Regiment	ake ake kia kaha	Māori	For ever and ever strong	Disestablished
1st Regiment (Otago) Mounted Rifles	Es Fidelis	Latin	Be Faithful	Disestablished
2nd Canterbury, Nelson, Marlborough, West Coast Battalion Group	ake ake kia kaha	Māori	For ever and ever strong	Disestablished
2nd (South Canterbury) Regiment	Pro Patria	Latin	For my country	Disestablished
3rd (Auckland) Mounted Rifles	kia tupato	Māori	Be Cautious	Disestablished
3rd (Auckland) Regiment (Countess of Ranfurly's Own)	Sisit Prudentia	Latin	Ever Prudent	Disestablished
4th (Waikato) Mounted Rifles	Libertas et natale solum	Latin	Liberty and my native land	Disestablished
4th Otago and Southland Battalion Group	kia mate toa	Māori	Fight unto death	Disestablished
5th Mounted Rifles (Otago Hussars)	Es Fidelis	Latin	Be Faithful	Disestablished
5th (Wellington Rifles) Regiment	Virtutis Fortuna Comes	Latin	Good fortune is the companion of courage	Disestablished
6th (Manawatu) Mounted Rifles	he kawau maro	Māori	Unyelding as the shag	Disestablished
6th Hauraki Battalion Group	whakatangata kia kaha	Māori	Acquit yourselves like men, be strong	Disestablished
6th (Hauraki) Regiment	whakatangata kia kaha	Māori	Acquit yourselves like men, be strong	Disestablished
7th (Southland) Mounted Rifles	Celer Et Audax	Latin	Swift and bold	Disestablished
7th (Wellington West Coast) Regiment	Acer in Armis	Latin	Strong in Arms	Disestablished
8th (South Canterbury) Mounted Rifles	Moveo Et Profitior	Latin	By my actions I am known	Disestablished
8th (Southland Rifles) Regiment	kia mate toa	Māori	Fight unto death	Disestablished
1st New Zealand Ranger Company	Te Kaha Me Te Te Nanakia	Māori	The Powerful and the Cruel	Disestablished

- Royal New Zealand Air Force: Per ardua ad astra (Latin for "through adversity to the stars")

== Norway ==
- Forsvaret (Norwegian Armed Forces): current: For alt vi har. Og alt vi er. (Norwegian for "For all we have. And all we are."); former: For fred og frihet (Norwegian for "For peace and freedom")
  - Hæren (Norwegian Army): currently no motto for the Army, the same as Armed Forces are used.
    - 2. bataljon (2nd Battalion): In hoc signo vinces (Latin for "In this sign, thou shalt conquer")
    - 6. divisjon (6th Division): Evne til kamp – vilje til fred (Norwegian for "Capability to fight – will for peace")
    - Artilleribataljonen (Artillery Battalion): Gjør rett, frykt ingen (Norwegian for "Do right, fear no one")
      - Batteri Nils (Battery N): Brigadens slagbjørn (Norwegian for "Brigade's killer bear")
      - Forsyningsbatteriet (Supply Battery): Robur et fidelis (Latin for "Strength through unity")
      - Kampluftvernbatteriet (Air Defense Battery): Prius ignis – Mortem ex inferis (Latin for "First fire – Death from hell")
      - Samvirkebatteriet (Cooperation Battery): Communiter Victor(?) (Latin for "Victory together")
    - CSS-bataljonen (Combat Service Support Battalion): Protinus Recte (Latin for "Right the first time")
    - Garnisonen i Sør-Varanger (Garrison of Sør-Varanger)
      - Jegerkompaniet (Arctic Ranger Company): Agmine Consectamur (Latin for "We hunt in packs"); also: Agmine Consectamur Rebus In Arctois (Latin for "We hunt in packs in the Arctic")
    - Hans Majestet Kongens Garde (His Majesty The King's Guard): Alt for Kongen! (Norwegian for "Everything for the King!")
    - Hærens Taktiske Treningssenter (Army's Tactical Training Center): Tren for det verste – bli de beste (Norwegian for "Train for the worst – become the best")
    - Ingeniørvåpenet (Arm of Engineers): Ubique que fas et gloria ducunt (Latin for "Everywhere where right and glory lead")
    - Krigsskolen (Norwegian Military Academy): Si vis pacem, para bellum (Latin for "If you want peace, prepare for war")
    - Panserbataljonen (Armoured Battalion): Bitit fyrst (Old Norse for "Strike first")
      - Stridsvogneskadron 2 (Armoured Squadron 2): Vi er allerede der (Norwegian for "We're already there")
      - Stormeskadron 3 (Mechanised Infantry Squadron 3): Semper Paratus (Latin for "Always ready")
      - Stormeskadron 4 (Mechanised Infantry Squadron 4): Gul ad arma, plus ultra (Latin for "Wolverines to battle, continue forward")
      - Kavalerieskadron 5 (Cavalry Squadron 5): Primus Intrat, Exit Novissimus (Latin for "First in, last out")
      - Kampstøtteeskadron 6 (Combat Service Support Squadron 6): Volens et Potens (Latin for "Willing and able")
      - Oppklaringseskadronen (Reconnaissance Squadron): Ser alt, alltid (Norwegian for "Sees all, always")
      - Fjernoppklaringseskadronen (Remote Reconnaissance Squadron): Ingen respekt for avstanden (Norwegian for "No respect for the distance")
      - Bombekastertroppen (Mortar Platoon): Mors desuper veniens (Latin for "Death from above")
  - Sjøforsvaret (Royal Norwegian Navy): For Konge, fedreland og flaggets hæder (Dano-Norwegian for "For King, country and the flag's honour")
    - Kystartilleriet (Coastal Artillery): Klar til strid (Norwegian for "Ready for battle")
  - Luftforsvaret (Royal Norwegian Air Force): Konge, folk og fedreland (Norwegian for "King, people, and fatherland")
    - 131 Luftving (131 Air Wing): Visshet gir styrke (Norwegian for "Knowledge gives power")
      - Sensorskvadronen (Sensor Squadron): Oculi nostri, tua securitas (Latin for "Our eyes, your security")
    - 330 skvadron (330 Squadron): current: Vi redder liv (Norwegian for "We save lives"); former: Trygg havet (Norwegian for "Secure the sea")
    - Batteri 50M (Air Defence Artillery, battery 50M): Si Volas – Morieris (Latin for "If it flies – it dies")
  - Heimevernet (Norwegian Home Guard): current: Overalt – alltid (Norwegian for "Everywhere – all the time"); former: Verner, vokter, virker (Norwegian for "protects, guards, acts")
- Norsk Reservistforbund (Norwegian Reserve Officers' Federation): Pro patria (Latin for "For the fatherland")
- Former company in KFOR: Lead, don't follow

== Pakistan ==
- Pakistan Army (Urdu: پاک فوج) Motto (Urdu): Iman, Taqwa, Jihad fi Sabilillah (English translation: "Faith, Piety, Struggle for Allah")
- Pakistan Air Force (Urdu: پاک فضائیه) Motto (Persian): Sahrast ke daryast tah-e-bal-o-par-e-mast (English translation:- "Be it the deserts / Be it the rivers / All are under my wings")
  - No. 9 Squadron: "How high you fly depends on how brave you are"
  - No. 11 Squadron: "Your destination is beyond everyone else's destination"
  - No. 14 Squadron: "Bold and fearless, endowed with undaunted spirit and great measure of heavenly might"
- Pakistan Navy (Urdu : پاک بحریہ) Motto (Arabic): (English translation: Allah (Alone) is Sufficient for us, and he is the Best Disposer of affairs)
- "A silent force to be reckoned with"
- Pakistan Marines (Urdu: پا مير ينز) Motto (Arabic): (English translation: "And hold fast to the rope of God and do not be divided")
- Pakistan Coast Guards Motto (English): Defending and Protecting what is Rightfully Ours)
- Airport Security Forces Pakistan Motto (Urdu: ہر دم تیار) (English Translation: Always Ready)
- Pakistan Rangers (Urdu: پاکستان رینجرز) Motto (Urdu): داﯾمً ﺳﺎﮪرً Daaeman Saaheran (English translation: "Ever Vigil")

== Philippines ==
Armed Forces of the Philippines

- Armed Forces of the Philippines: "Protecting the People, Securing the State"
- Philippine Army: "Serving the People, Securing the Land"
  - 1st Infantry Division (Philippines): "Your Security, Our Mission, Community Development, Our Goal"
  - 2nd Infantry Division (Philippines): "Advocates of Peace. Servants of the People. Defenders of Southern Tagalog"
  - 3rd Infantry Division (Philippines): "Loved by the people, Feared by the Enemy"
  - 5th Infantry Division (Philippines): "Only our best is good enough"
  - 6th Infantry Division (Philippines): "Kampilan" ("Sword")
  - 7th Infantry Division (Philippines): "Kaugnay" ("Ally")
  - 9th Infantry Division (Philippines): "Second to None"
  - 1st Scout Ranger Regiment: "We Strike"
  - Special Forces Regiment (Philippines): "Courage and Determination"
  - Light Reaction Regiment: "Tiradores de la Muerte" ("Sharpshooters of Death")
  - Army Artillery Regiment: "Rex Belli" ("King of Battle")
- Philippine Navy: "Protecting the Seas, Securing our Future"
  - Philippine Marine Corps: Karangalan, Katungkulan, Kabayanihan ("Honor, Duty, Valour")
- Philippine Air Force: "Guardians of our Precious skies, Bearers of Hope"

== Portugal ==
- Portuguese Armed Forces: Que quem quis sempre pôde ("For those who wanted, always could") - from Os Lusíadas, Book IX, 95th Stanza.
- Portuguese Navy: Talent de bien faire (Old French for: "Talent of doing well") - motto of Henry the Navigator
  - Marine Corps: Braço às armas feito ("Arms bearing Arms") — from Os Lusíadas, Book X, 155th Stanza.
  - Portuguese Navy ships: A Pátria honrar que a Pátria vos contempla (Portuguese for: "Honor the Motherland, for the Motherland beholds you")
- Portuguese Army: Em perigos e guerras esforçados ("In arduous perils and wars") — from Os Lusíadas, Book I, 1st Stanza.
  - Commandos: Audaces fortuna juvat (Latin for "Fortune favours the bold")
  - Parachute Troops School: Que nunca por vencidos se conheçam ("May they never be found defeated") — from Os Lusíadas, Book VII, 71st Stanza.
  - Special Operations Troops Centre: Que os muitos por ser poucos não temamos ("May we few not fear the many" - from Os Lusíadas, Book VIII, 36th Stanza.
- Portuguese Air Force: Ex mero motu (Latin for "From the mere motion")
- National Republican Guard: Pela lei e pela grei ("For the law and for the people")
- Public Security Police: Pela ordem e pela Pátria (Portuguese for "For order and for the Motherland")
  - Special Operations Group (GOE): Última razão (Portuguese for "Last reason")

== Romania ==
- Land Forces Academy "Nicolae Balcescu": "Mereu împreună" ("Always together")
- Romanian Army Special Forces: "Death dodges the brave ones"

== Russia ==
- Russian Airborne Forces (VDV): "истина освободит вас" ("Truth is Freedom ")

== Serbia ==
- Serbian Special Forces Ко сме, тај може, ко не зна за страх, тај иде напред ("Who dares is able to, who knows no fear will move forward").

== Singapore ==
- Singapore Armed Forces/Singapore Army: Yang Pertama Dan Utama (Malay for "First and Foremost")
  - 2nd People's Defence Force: Steadfast We Stand
  - 3rd Division: Foremost and Utmost
  - 6th Division: Swift and Deadly
  - 9th Division/Infantry: Forging Ahead
  - Armour: Swift and Decisive
  - Army Deployment Force: Always Ready
  - Army Intelligence: First Line of Defence
  - Army Medical Services: Life First
  - Artillery: In Oriente Primus (Latin for "First in the East")
  - Combat Engineers: Advance and Overcome
  - Commandos: For Honour and Glory
  - Guards: Ready To Strike
  - Maintenance and Engineering Support: Excellence Through Professionalism
  - Military Police: Pride, Discipline, Honour
  - SAF Ammunition Command: The Heart of SAF's Firepower
  - Signals: Speed Through Skill
  - Supply/Transport: Reliable, Efficient, Professional
- Republic of Singapore Navy: Beyond Horizons
  - Maritime Security Task Force: Frontline 24/7
  - Naval Diving Unit: Nothing Stands In Our Way
- Republic of Singapore Air Force: Above All
  - Air Combat Command: Poised and Deadly
  - Air Defence and Operations Command: Vigilant and Ready
  - Air Force Training Command: Excellence
  - Air Power Generation Command: Generate and Sustain
  - Participation Command: Integrate and Dominate
  - Unmanned Aerial Vehicle Command: Persistent and Precise
- Digital and Intelligence Service: Defend and Dominate
- Basic Military Training Centre: Excel Through Basics
- Officer Cadet School: To Lead, To Excel, To Overcome
- SAF Medical Corps: To Seek, To Save, To Serve
- SAF Volunteer Corps: Steadfast & Vigilant
- Special Operations Force/Special Operations Task Force: We Dare
- Specialist Cadet School: With Pride We Lead

== South Africa ==
South African Army

- South African Army Armoured Formation: Pectore Sicut Ferro (With a chest of steel)
  - 1 South African Tank Regiment: We Make The Rules
  - 1 Special Service Battalion: Eendrag Maak Mag (Unity is Strength)
- South African Army Infantry Formation: Gladium Practamus (Wielders of the Sword)
  - 1 Parachute Battalion: Ex alto vincimus (We conquer from Above)
  - 6 South African Infantry Battalion: Aliis Melius
  - 9 South African Infantry Battalion: Fortiter et fideliter (Boldly and faithfully)
- South African Army Artillery Formation
  - 4 Artillery Regiment (South Africa): Always in support

South African Air Force: Per aspera ad astra (English:Through hardships to the stars)

- 16 Squadron SAAF: "Hlaselani" (Attack)

South African Special Forces

- 4 Special Forces Regiment: Iron fist from the sea
- 5 Special Forces Regiment: We fear naught but God

== Spain ==
Spanish Military: "Todo por la Patria" (Spanish for "Everything for the Motherland")

== Sri Lanka ==
- Sri Lanka Armoured Corps: Whither the fates call
- Sri Lanka Artillery: On the Way to Justice and Glory
- Sri Lanka Engineers: "Ubique" (Latin) – "Everywhere"
- Sri Lanka Signals Corps: ස්ථීර ක්‍ෂණික Sthira Kshanika (Sinhala) - "Swift and sure"
- Sri Lanka Light Infantry: "Ich Dien" (German) – "I serve"
- Sri Lanka Sinha Regiment: නිර්භීත වේගවත් Nirbhitha Vegavath (Sinhala) - "Swift and bold"
- Gemunu Watch: Terry Not Forward
- Gajaba Regiment: Samagiya Shakthiyai (Sinhala) - "Unity is Strength"
- Vijayabahu Infantry Regiment: What – cannot they bear, those who are adept and well versed in their arts and crafts and professions
- Mechanized Infantry Regiment: ජවයෙන් පෙරමුණට Jayaven Peramunata (Sinhala) - "Forward with Vigor"
- Commando Regiment: - නොහැක්කක් නොමැත Nohækkak Nomætha (Sinhala) - "Nothing is impossible"
- Special Force Regiment: අධිෂ්ඨානයෙන් අභීතව අරමුණ කරා Adhisthanayen Abhithawa Aramuna Kara (Sinhala) - "To the target with determination and bravery, Determined, Dared and Done"
- Military Intelligence Corps: නැණ රණ ජය Næna Rana Jaya (Sinhala) - Wisdom, Battle, Victory
- Corps of Engineer Services:
- Sri Lanka Army Service Corps:
- Sri Lanka Army Medical Corps:
- Sri Lanka Army Ordnance Corps: To the Warrior His Arms
- Sri Lanka Electrical and Mechanical Engineers: Skill to Battle
- Sri Lanka Corps of Military Police: Exemplo Ducemus (Latin) - "By example, shall we lead"
- Sri Lanka Army General Service Corps:
- Sri Lanka Army Women's Corps: The Powerful Mind is the Strongest Weapon
- Sri Lanka Rifle Corps:
- Sri Lanka Army Pioneer Corps: ශ්‍රමය ජාතියක ජීවයයි Shramaya Jathiyaka Jivayai (Sinhala) - "Work is the Lifeblood of a Nation"
- Sri Lanka National Guard: ස්වාර්ථයට පෙර දේශය Swarthayata Pera Deshaya (Sinhala) - "Country before self"

== Switzerland ==
- Infanterie Durchdiener Bataillon 14 und Schule (Infantry Readiness Battalion 14 and School): Miles Protector (Latin for "Protector soldier")
- Kommando Spezialkräfte: Honor, Unitas, Modestia (Latin for "Honor, Unity, Modesty")
- Infanterie OS: Exemplo ducemus (Latin for "Leading by example")
- Inf Grenadiere: Semper fidelis (Latin for "Always faithful")
- Pz Aufklärer: Videre sine videri (Latin for "Seeing without being seen")
- Fallschirmaufklärer: Per aspera ad astra (Latin for "Rough paths lead to the stars")
- Panzergrenadiere: in corde veritas (Latin for "truth in the heart")

== Sweden ==
- Swedish Air Force
  - Blekinge Wing: Styrka genom samverkan (Swedish for "Strength through cooperation")
  - Skaraborg Wing: Vilja, kunnande, ära (Swedish for "Will, knowledge, honour")
  - Uppland Wing: Labor, effectus, vigor (Latin for "Work, efficiency, satisfaction")
  - Västmanland Wing: Per aspera ad astra (Latin for "Through hardships to the stars")
- Swedish Army
  - Artillery Regiment: Ultima ratio regum (Latin for "the last resort of kings")
  - Göta Engineer Regiment: Viam inveniam aut faciam (Latin for "I will find a way or create one")
  - Jämtland Ranger Corps: För Sveriges ära, för Sveriges makt, över berg, över dal, skallar Jämtlands jakt (Swedish for "For Sweden's honour, for Sweden's might, over mountain, over valley, the Jämtian rangers resound")
  - Life Guards: Possunt nec posse videntur (Latin for "they can do what it seems they cannot")
  - Life Regiment Hussars: Pergite! (Latin for "forward!")
  - Air Defence Regiment: Semper metam contingimus (Latin for "we always reach our goals")
  - Norrbotten Regiment: De hafva aldrig wikit eller för sin egen dehl tappadt (Swedish for "Never have they yielded, nor given ground")
    - Norrland Engineer Company: Nos nihil efficere non possumus (Latin for "to us, nothing is impossible")
  - Skaraborg Regiment: Arvet förpliktar (Swedish for "the heritage obligates")
    - 42:a Mekaniserade Bataljonen (42nd Mechanised Battalion): Coniucti fortes (Latin for "together strong")
      - Kåkinds kompani (Kåkind Company): Följ mig (Swedish for "follow me")
  - South Scanian Regiment: Framåtanda och stolthet (Swedish for "ambition and pride") and Slå snabbt - slå hårt (Swedish for "Strike fast - strike hard")
  - Västernorrland Regiment: För ditt land, din hembygd, ditt regemente (Swedish for "For your country, your home region, your regiment")
- Swedish Navy
  - 1st Submarine Flotilla: Esse non videre (Latin for "To be without being seen")
  - 4th Naval Warfare Flotilla: Prudentia et constantia (Latin for "Thoroughness and perseverance")
  - Swedish Amphibious Corps
    - 1. Amfibiebataljonen (1st Amphibious Battalion): Facile princips (Latin for "simple principles")
    - 2. Amfibiebataljonen (2nd Amphibious Battalion): Ubique vigilans (Latin for "vigilant everywhere")
    - 3. Amfibiebataljonen (3rd Amphibious Battalion): Fortis, robur et velox (Latin for "brave, strong, and fast")
    - 4. Amfibiebataljonen (4th Amphibious Battalion): Victoria (Latin for "victory")
    - 5. Amfibiebataljonen (5th Amphibious Battalion): Västkustens styrka och stolthet (Swedish for "strength and pride of the west coast")
    - 6. Amfibiebataljonen (6th Amphibious Battalion): Primus sub stella polaris (Latin for "the first under the polar star")
- Särskilda operationsgruppen (Special Operations Task Group): Framåt i natten (Swedish for "forward through the night")

== Tunisia ==
Tunisian Armed Forces

- Groupe des Forces Spéciales (GFS) "الإنتصار أو إستشهاد Victory or martyrdom"

== Ukraine ==
- Ukrainian Naval Infantry: Вірний завжди! (Ukrainian for "Always faithful!")
- Special Operations Forces: Іду на ви! (Ukrainian for "I Come at You!")
- Kyiv Presidential Honor Guard Battalion: Ubi concordia ibi victoria (Latin for "Where there is unity, there is victory")
- 93rd Mechanized Brigade: Nunquam Retrorsum (Latin for "Never Forgotten")
- 79th Air Assault Brigade: В єднанні - сила! (Ukrainian for "In Unity is Power!")
- 95th Air Assault Brigade: Сила, мужність, честь (Ukrainian for "Strength, Courage, Honor")
- 128th Mountain Assault Brigade: Для України, за її свободу (Ukrainian for "For Ukraine, for its freedom.")

== United Kingdom ==
- British Army: Be the best (Unofficial), WW1- For king and Country
  - Adjutant General's Corps: Animo et fide (Latin for "determination and honesty")
  - Intelligence Corps: Manui dat cognitio vires (Latin for "knowledge gives strength to the arm")
  - Parachute Regiment: Utrinque paratus (Latin for "ready for anything")
  - Royal Artillery: Ubique quo fas et gloria ducunt (Latin for "everywhere right and glory lead")
  - Royal Corps of Signals: Certa cito (Latin for "swift and sure")
  - Royal Engineers: Ubique quo fas et gloria ducunt (Latin for "everywhere right and glory lead")
  - Royal Military Police: Exemplo ducemus (Latin for "by example, shall we lead")
  - Special Air Service: Who dares wins
  - The Rifles: Celer et audax (Latin for "swift and bold")
  - The Royal Regiment of Scotland: Nemo me impune lacessit (Latin for "No one provokes me with impunity")
- Royal Navy: Si vis pacem, para bellum (Latin for "if you wish for peace, prepare for war")
  - Royal Navy Police: Ne cede malis (Latin for "do not give in to evil")
  - Special Boat Service: By strength and guile
- Royal Marines: Per mare, per terram (Latin for "by sea, by land")
- Royal Air Force: Per ardua ad astra (Latin for "through adversity to the stars")
  - Royal Air Force Police: Fiat justitia (Latin for "let justice be done")

=== Disbanded ===
- Queen Alexandra's Royal Army Nursing Corps: Sub cruce candida (Latin for "under the white cross")
- Royal Army Dental Corps: Ex dentibus ensis (Latin for "from the teeth a sword")
- Royal Army Medical Corps: In arduis fidelis (Latin for "faithful in adversity")

==== Territorial Force ====
- London Irish Rifles: Quis separabit? (Latin for "who shall separate us?")
- London Scottish: Strike sure

== Vietnam ==
- Vietnam People's Army: Nothing is more precious than independence and freedom (Không có gì quý hơn độc lập tự do)
  - Vietnam People's Ground Force: Determined to win (Quyết thắng)
  - Vietnam People's Navy: Island is home, Sea is country (Đảo là nhà, Biển cả là quê hương)
  - Vietnam People's Air Force:
  - Vietnam Border Defense Force: Post is home, Border is country, Ethnic people are brothers (Đồn là nhà, Biên giới là quê hương, Đồng bào các dân tộc là anh em ruột thịt)
  - Vietnam Coast Guard:
- Vietnam People's Public Security: Protect the security of the Fatherland (Bảo vệ an ninh Tổ quốc)
- Republic of Vietnam Military Forces (Military of the former government of South Vietnam from 1949 until the reunification in 1975): The Fatherland - Honour - Duty (Tổ Quốc - Danh dự - Trách nhiệm, Việt Nam Cộng Hoà).

== See also ==
- List of university and college mottos
