= Commando Regiment =

Commando Regiment may refer to:

- Commando Battalion (Albania), Albanian Land Forces, Albania
- Parachute Commando Regiments, Algeria
- 1st Commando Regiment (Australia), Australia
- 2nd Commando Regiment (Australia)
- Immediate Reaction Cell, formally known as the Para-Commando Regiment, Belgium
- Marine Commando Regiment, proposed unit, Canada
- Lebanese Commando Regiment, Lebanon
- 21st and 22nd Commando Regiments of the Gurp Gerak Khas, Malaysia
- 1st Special Commando Regiment, Poland
- Commando Regiment, Portugal
- Sri Lanka Army Commando Regiment, Sri Lanka
- 29th Commando Regiment Royal Artillery, United Kingdom

== See also ==
- Commando
