= Southern Infantry Regiment =

- Regjimenti i Këmbësorisë së Jugut
- Country: Albania
- Branch: Albanian Land Force
- Type: Infantry
- Role: Light infantry
- Size: 3 battalion
- Garrison: Poshnjë, Berat
- Nickname(s): RKJ
- Website: Official website

Commanders
- Current commander: Colonel Gezim Marku

Insignia
- Army Shoulder sleeve insignia

- Infantry speciality badge

The Southern Infantry Regiment (Albanian: Regjimenti i Këmbësorisë së Jugut , RKJ) is an infantry regiment, part of the Albanian Land Force. The RKJ it is based in Poshnjë, Berat County. It consists of 3 battalions. Normally they fall under the command of Land Force Command and Staff.

== See also ==
- Albanian Armed Forces
- Albanian Land Force
- Albanian Naval Force
- Albanian Air Force
