= Marine Commando Regiment =

Proposed military unit in the Canadian Forces

The creation of a Canadian Marine Commando Regiment (MCR) was suggested as a possibility in 2007, potentially to be based at Canadian Forces Base Comox. It was reported to have a potential initial strength of approximately 250 members. The initiative was never advanced beyond the concept stage.

== Background ==
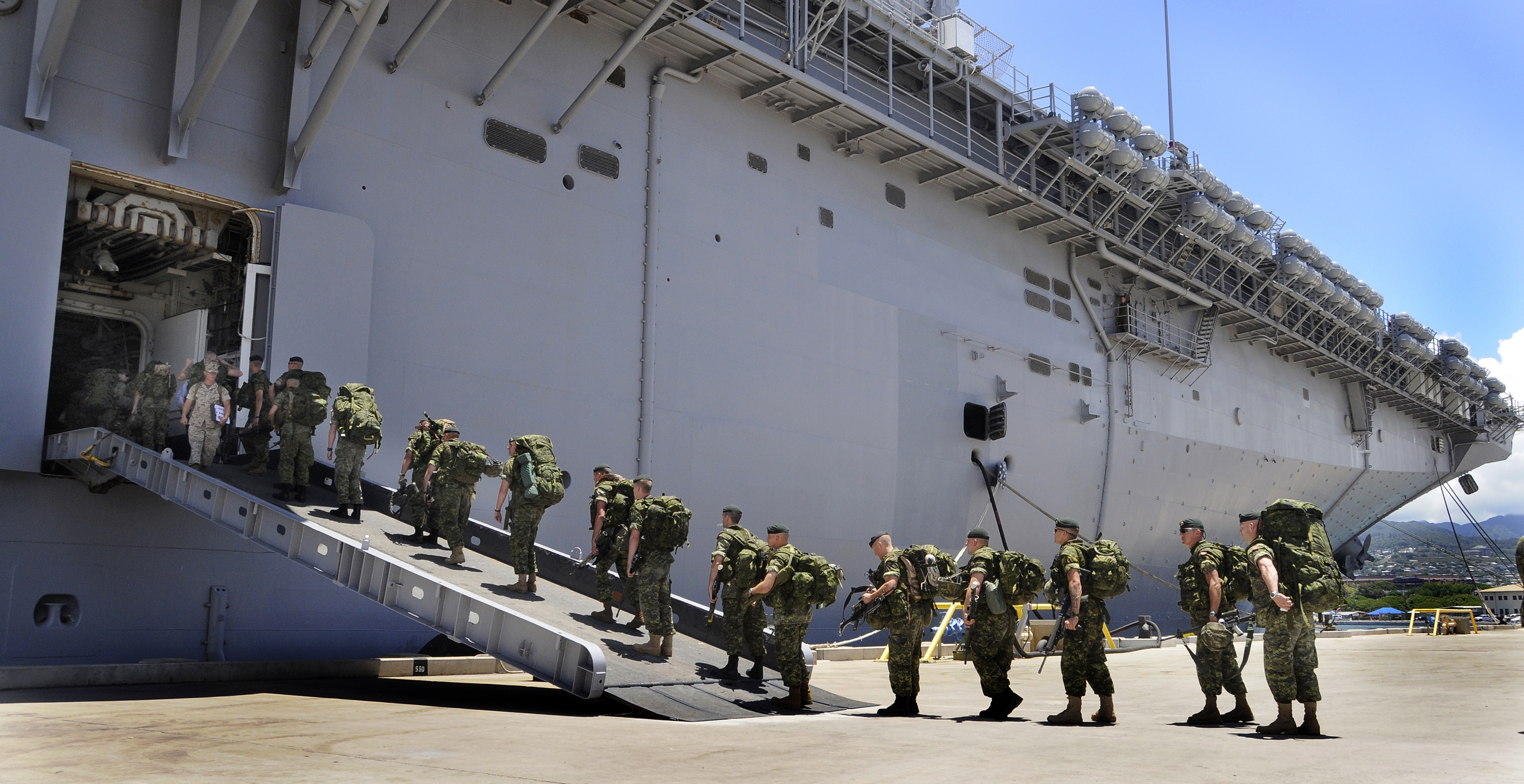
PPCLI boarding a US Navy amphibious assault ship during RIMPAC 2008

The concept of a mobile combined force was originally conceived in 1994, but due to reduced operating budgets during the 1989–2002 period, the Canadian Forces simply did not have the budget to develop a new branch at that time. Following the events of September 11, 2001, as well as the brief 2006 Lebanon War during which many Canadian passport-holders were evacuated, the idea was once again revived in the form of the Marine Commando Regiment, as well as the Canadian Special Operations Regiment (separate from the MCR). In November 2006, the Royal 22^{e} Régiment participated in the Integrated Tactical Effects Experiment (ITEE), a three-week training exercise with the United States Marine Corps. In 2008, Princess Patricia's Canadian Light Infantry participated in similar training during RIMPAC with the United States Marine Corps and the Royal Australian Navy.

== See also ==
- Joint Task Force 2
- Canadian Special Operations Regiment
- CANSOFCOM
- Royal Canadian Navy
- Canadian Airborne Regiment
- Commando
