= Northern Infantry Regiment =

- Regjimenti i Këmbësorisë së Veriut
- Country: Albania
- Branch: Albanian Land Force
- Type: Infantry
- Role: Light infantry
- Size: 3 Battalion
- Garrison: RHQ – Vau i Dejës; 1st Battalion – Vau i Dejës; 2nd Battalion – Kukës; 3rd Battalion – Burrel
- Nickname: RKV
- Website: Official website

Commanders
- Current commander: Lieutenant Colonel Behar Toçilla

Insignia
- Army Shoulder sleeve insignia

- Infantry speciality badge

The Northern Infantry Regiment (Albanian: Regjimenti i Këmbësorisë së Veriut, RKV) is an infantry regiment, part of the Albanian Land Force. The Northern Infantry Regiment is headquartered in Vau i Dejës, Shkodër County, which also serves as the headquarters of the 1st Infantry Battalion.

It consists of 3 battalions and 2 support companies:

- 1st Battalion – Vau i Dejës
- 2nd Battalion – Kukës
- 3rd Battalion – Burrel
- Combat support company – Vau i Dejës
- Service support sompany – Vau i Dejës

The Northern Infantry Regiment falls under the command of Land Force Command and Staff.

== See also ==
- Albanian Armed Forces
- Albanian Land Force
- Albanian Naval Force
- Albanian Air Force
