= Group Light Infantry Battalion =

- Grup Batalioni i Këmbësorisë së Lehtë
- Country: Albania
- Branch: Albanian Land Force
- Type: Infantry
- Role: Light infantry
- Size: 5 companies
- Garrison: Zall-Herr, Tirana
- Nickname: GBKL
- Mottos: Fortior, Perserverantie, Fidem
- Website: Official website

Commanders
- Current commander: Colonel Blodinel Tafa

Insignia
- Army Shoulder sleeve insignia

- Infantry speciality badge

The Group Light Infantry Battalion (Albanian: Grup Batalioni i Këmbësorisë së Lehtë, GBKL) is an infantry battalion part of the Albanian Land Force. The BKL it is based in Zall-Herr, Tirana. It consists on 5 companies, with 100 – 130 soldiers each, with a total about 700, effective as a whole battalion. Normally they fall under the command of Land Force Command and Staff.

The GBKL is a light motorized infantry which serves as well as rapid reaction force. Since 2014, after Wales summit, became part of the newly established "Very High Readiness Joint Task Force"' (VJTF) and NRF, as a need of NATO allied countries.

== See also ==
- Albanian Armed Forces
- Albanian Land Force
- Albanian Naval Force
- Albanian Air Force
