= Albanian Land Forces =

Albanian Land Force
- Forca Tokësore
- Founded: 2000; 26 years ago
- Country: Albania
- Type: Army
- Role: National Defense
- Mottos: Fatherland, Honor, And Duty

Commanders
- President of Albania: Bajram Begaj
- Minister of Defense: Ermal Nufi
- Chief of the Albanian General Staff: Lt. Gen. Arben Kingji
- Commander of the Land Forces: Maj. Gen. Petrit Çuni

Insignia
- Identification symbol

- Flag

The Albanian Land Force (Albanian: Forca Tokësore të Republikës së Shqipërisë) is the land force branch of the Albanian Armed Forces.

== Mission ==
The Albanian Land Force's main mission is the defense of the independence, sovereignty and territorial integrity of the Republic of Albania, participation in humanitarian, combat, non-combat and peace support operations.

== History ==
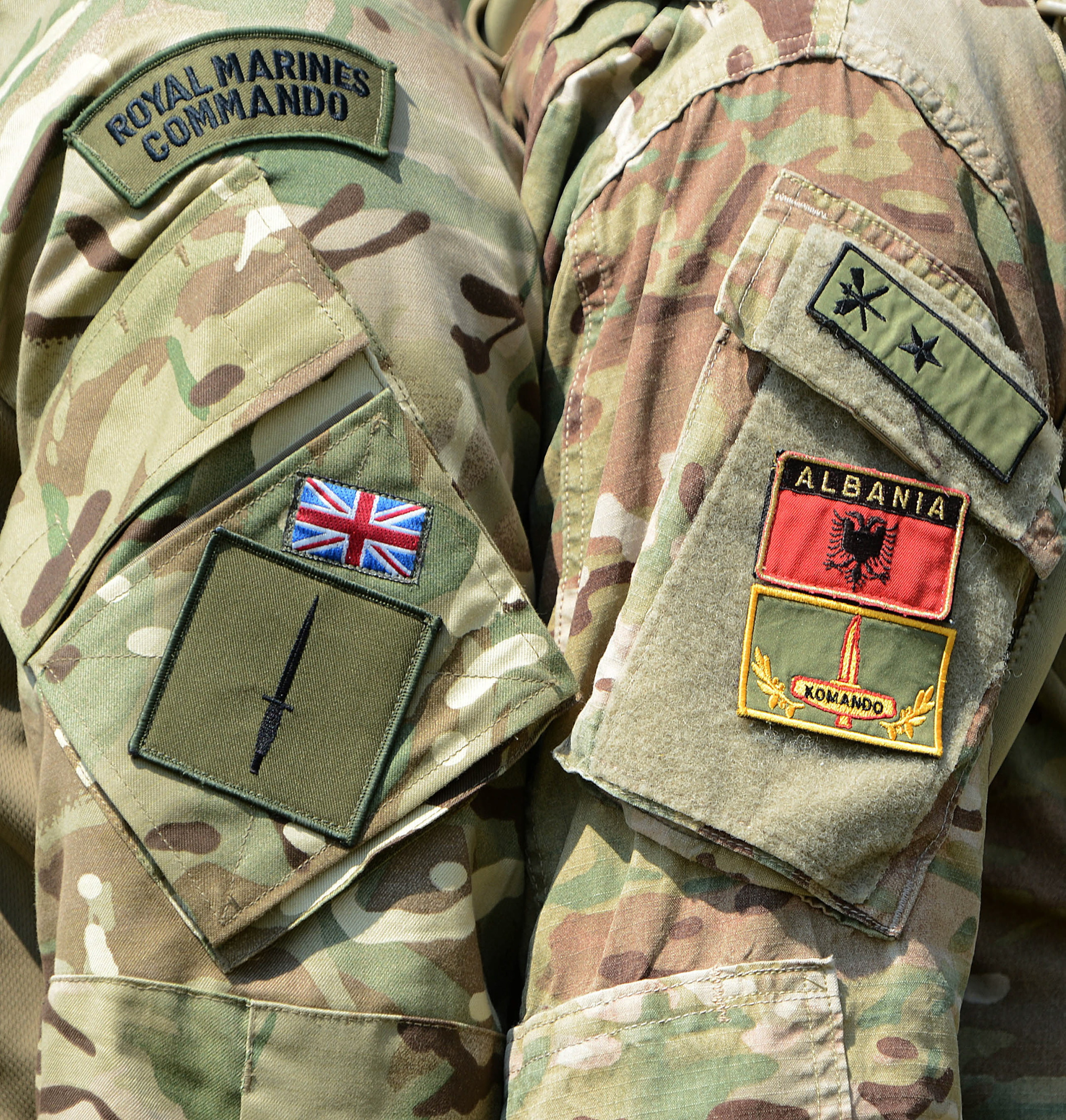
A British Royal Marine posing with an Albanian Commando (right), both showing their shoulder patches

Land Force is a priority unit in the structure of the Armed Forces. Land Force was established on August 29, 2000, and included military units with traditions and rich multi-year activity, spread across the territory of the Republic of Albania. In 2000 the Land Force included five infantry divisions with 55 brigades and 300 battalions deployed in 167 different regions of the country. During its continuous reform, the Land Force underwent new changes. In 2006 it was dissolved and the Joint Force Command was established. In the context of the ongoing transformation of the Armed Forces, based on the concept of an army small in number, operational and professional, on 9 December 2009 the Land Force was re-established on the basis of Rapid Reaction Brigade and Commando Regiment.

Based on the constitutional mission, the Land Force was involved in a process of profound transformation according to Western military concepts, and with the transition of the entire force from a conscript military service into a professional army, its operational level has increased. The structures of Land Force have been engaged in Peace Support Operations in Bosnia-Herzegovina, Iraq, Chad, Herat and Kandahar, Afghanistan. Land Force has the major share in peacekeeping operations in the framework of NATO, UN and EU. The Land Force is managed by young qualified leaders educated in military schools of NATO countries, as in the United States, Italy, Turkey, Germany, United Kingdom, Austria, etc., based on cooperation projects with these countries.

Land Force is engaged in civil emergency operations to help the community in cases of natural disasters, such as floods and blocked roads, and aid in distribution in cases of heavy snowfalls, fire suppression operations etc.etc.

Since its establishment the Land Force has been led by experienced commanders. From 2000 to 2006 it was headed by Maj. Gen. Kostaq Karoli; from 2006 to 2008 it was led by Brig. Gen. Shpëtim Spahiu; from 2008-August 2012 by Brig. Gen. Viktor Berdo. From August 2012 to November 2013 it has been commanded by Maj. Gen. Zyber Dushku. Since 11 November 2013, Maj. Gen. Jeronim Bazo has been Chief of Staff.

== Structure ==
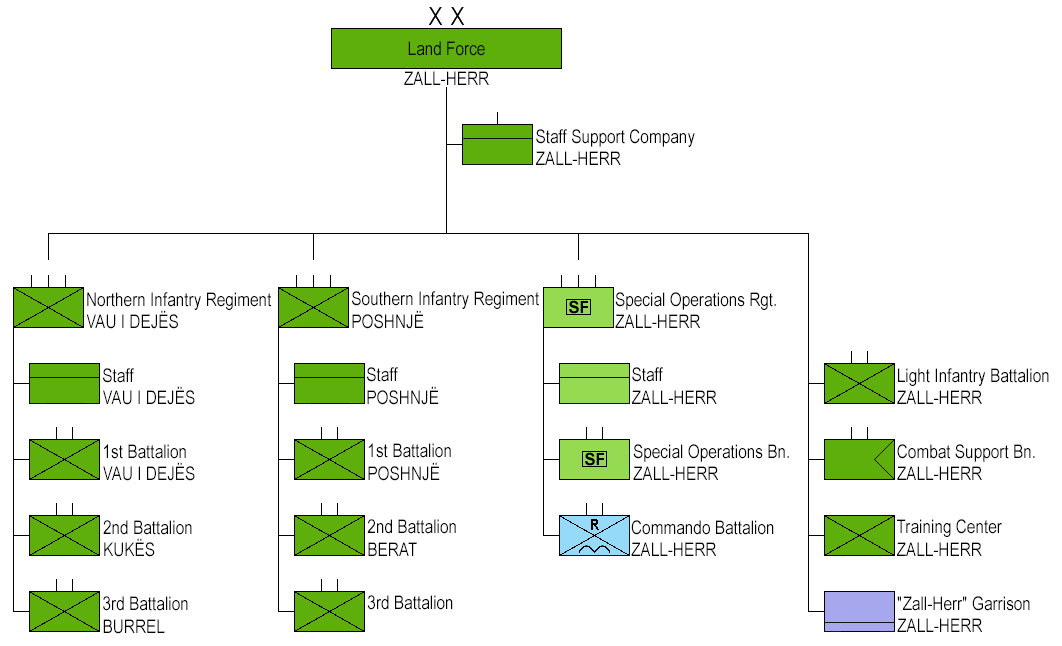
Albanian Land Force organization as of November 2025

Organizational divisions of the land force include:

- Albanian Land Force, in Zall-Herr
  - Staff Support Company, in Zall-Herr
  - Northern Infantry Regiment, in Vau i Dejës
    - 1st Battalion, in Vau i Dejës
    - 2nd Battalion, in Kukës
    - 3rd Battalion, in Burrel
  - Southern Infantry Regiment, in Poshnjë
    - 1st Battalion, in Poshnjë
    - 2nd Battalion, in Gjirokastër
    - 3rd Battalion Drenovë
  - Special Operations Regiment, in Zall-Herr
    - Special Operations Battalion, in Zall-Herr
    - Commando Battalion, in Zall-Herr
  - Light Infantry Battalion, in Zall-Herr (assigned to NATO Response Force)
  - Combat Support Battalion, in Zall-Herr
  - "Zall-Herr" Garrison, in Zall-Herr
  - Training Center, in Zall-Herr

== Ranks ==
=== Officer ranks ===
NATO code	OF-10	OF-9	OF-8	OF-7	OF-6	OF-5	OF-4	OF-3	OF-2	OF-1
Albanian Land Force
Albanian Land Force			Gjeneral lejtant	Gjeneral major	Gjeneral brigade	Kolonel	Nënkolonel	Major	Kapiten	Toger	Nëntoger

=== Other ranks ===
NATO code	OR-9	OR-8	OR-7	OR-6	OR-5	OR-4	OR-3	OR-2	OR-1
Albanian Land Force
Albanian Land Force	Kryekapter	Kapter	Rreshter	Tetar	Nëntetar	Ushtar IV	Ushtar III	Ushtar II	Ushtar I

== Gallery ==
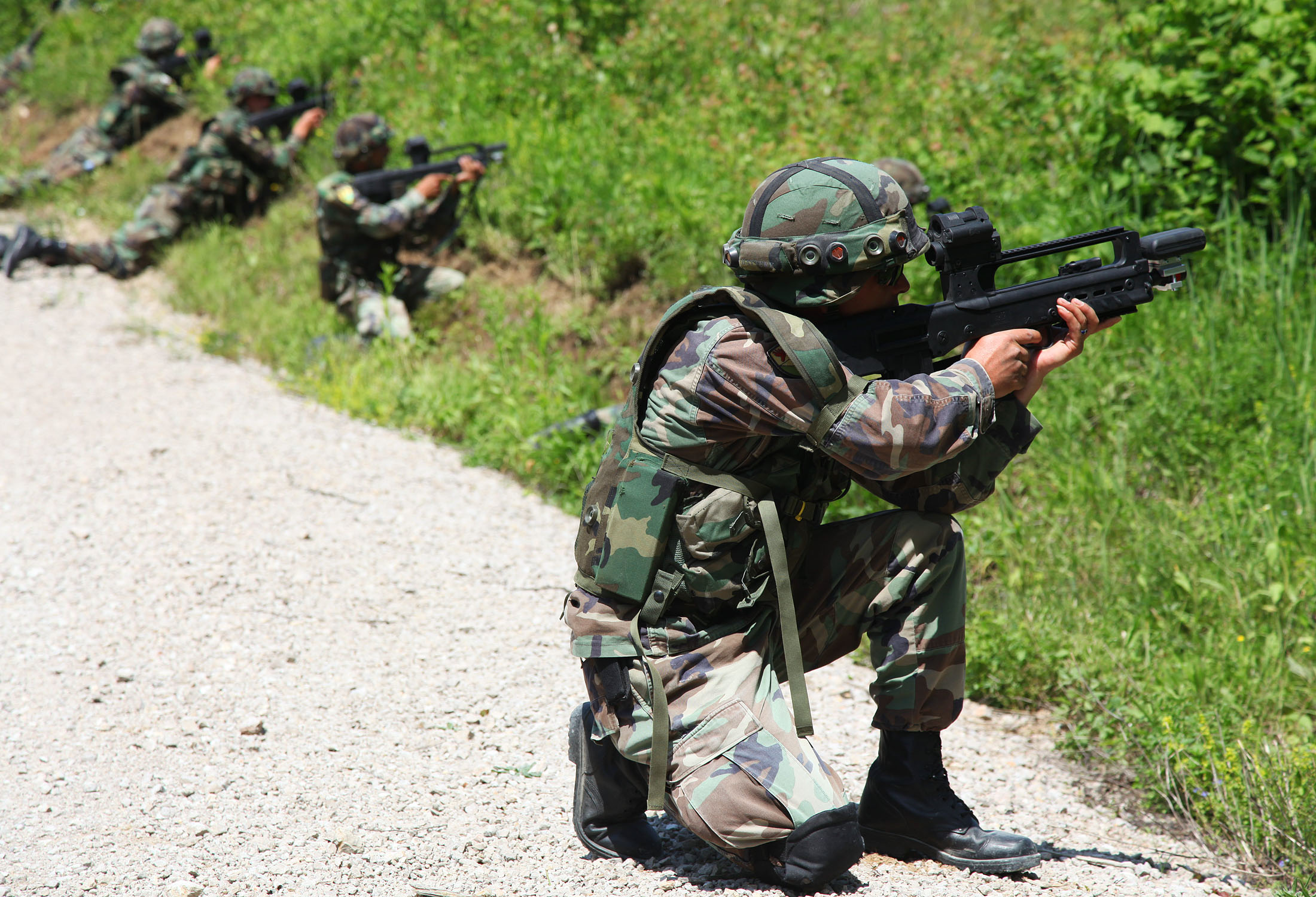
Albanian soldiers with VHS rifles

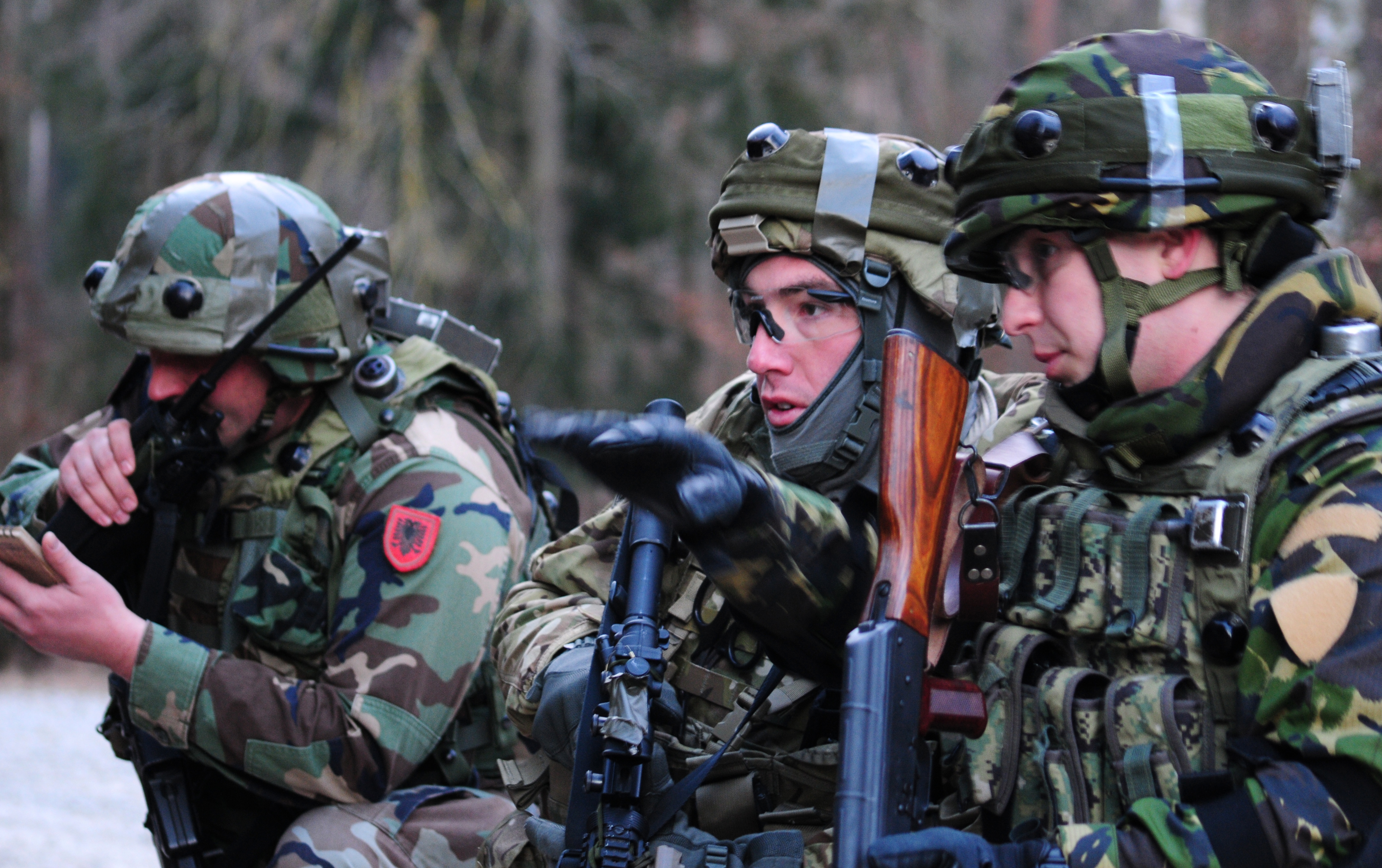
Albanian, U.S. and Romanian soldiers in a joint drill

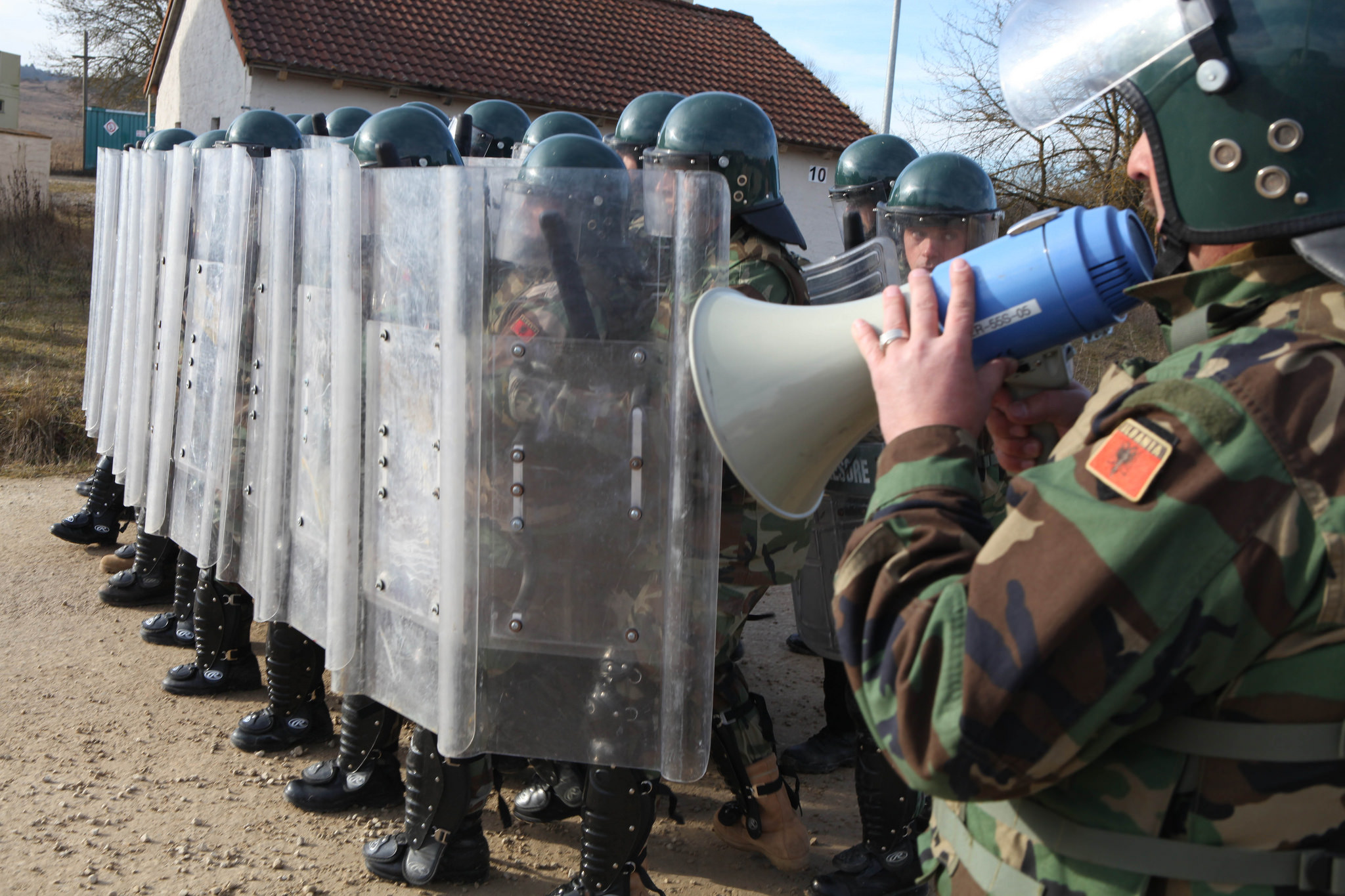
Albanian soldiers react to rioters, roleplayed by US forces, during KFOR

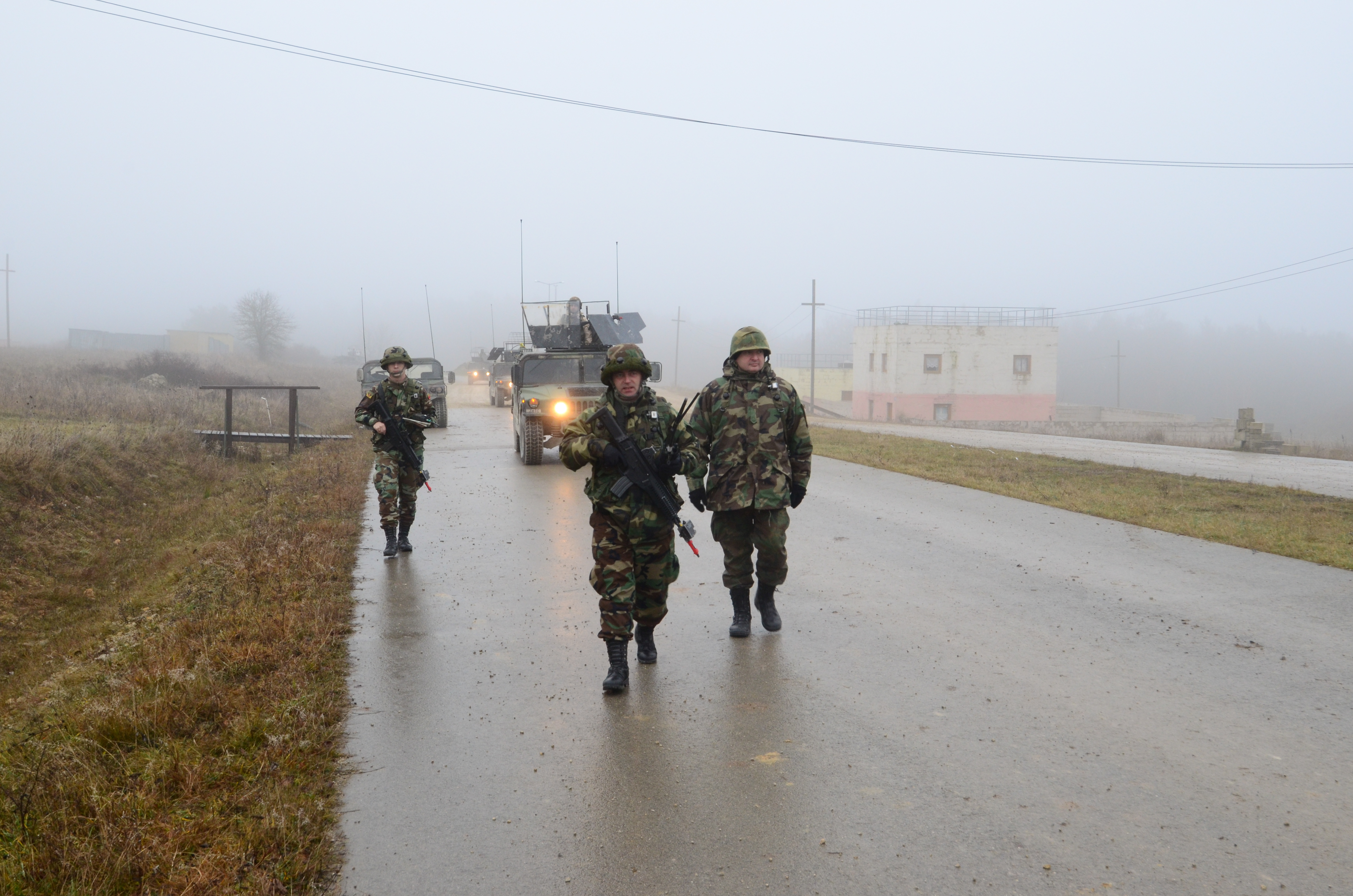
Albanian army convoy on patrol

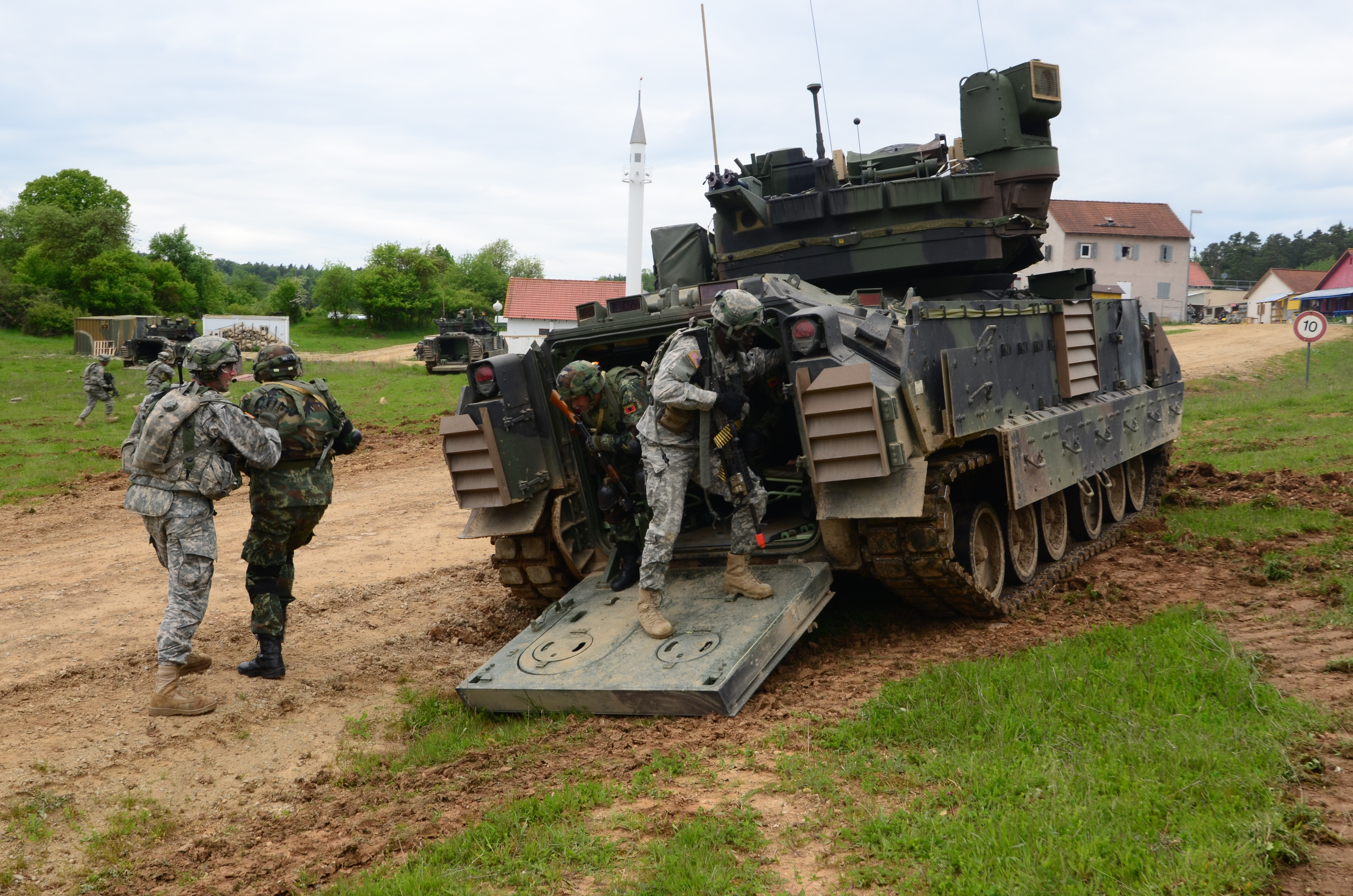
Albanian and US soldiers dismounting a M2 Bradley during Combined Resolve II

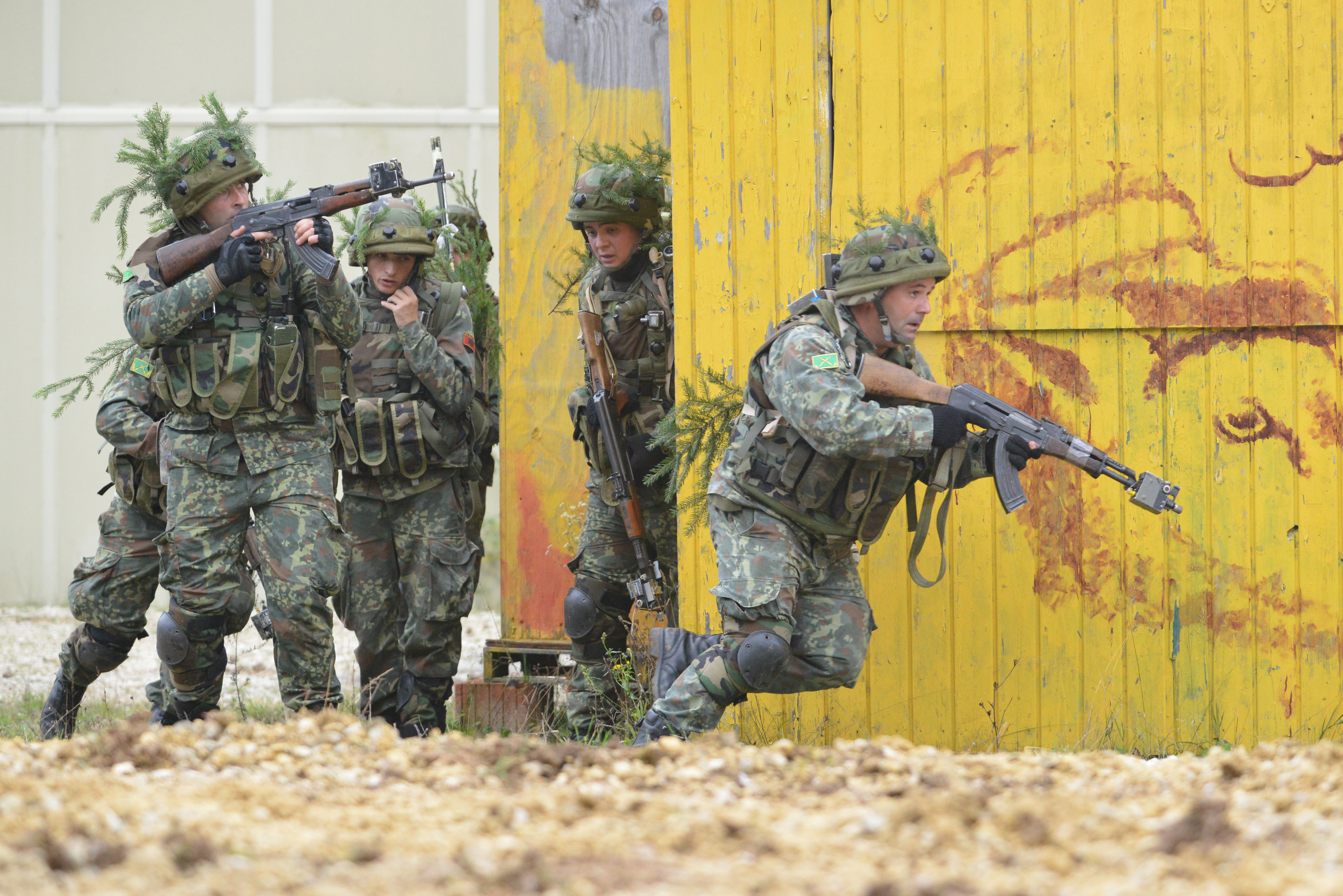
Albanian Land Force in Combined Resolve III

== See also ==
- Royal Albanian Army
- Albanian Air Force
- Albanian Navy
