= Commando Battalion (Albania) =

- Batalioni Komando
- Active: 1998-Present
- Country: Albania
- Branch: Albanian Land Forces
- Type: Infantry
- Role: Special operations Counter-terrorism; Close-quarters combat Urban warfare
- Size: Battalion
- Motto(s): Commando lead the way
- Branch colours Colour of Beret: Blue Blue
- Engagements: Kosovo War; Operation Iraqi Freedom; Operation Enduring Freedom; Resolute Support Mission; Kosovo Force

Commanders
- Current commander: Lieutenant Colonel Pëllumb Hidri

Insignia
- Right shoulder patch

Commando Battalion (Albanian: Batalioni Komando), is one of elite units of the Albanian Land Forces. The unit is tasked with special operations in wartime, and primarily with counter-terrorism in peacetime. The Commando members can be recognized by their blue berets, and the unit insignia which is carried on the right sleeve of their uniforms.

== History ==
The Commando Battalion was created in 1998 as a direct answer to the region's geopolitical situation and was part of Special Operation Battalion. Shortly after their creation, teams of commando operators were deployed along the Albanian-Yugoslav border during the Kosovo War in 1999 and later along the Albanian-Macedonian border during that country's war in 2001. During these two conflicts, Commandos' main tasks were reconnaissance and long-range patrol. In 2002, commando operators were deployed in Afghanistan as part of Operation Enduring Freedom. In Afghanistan, the first contingents operated under Turkish command and their tasks mainly dealt with patrolling the areas around Kabul.In 2003, Albania sent a unit from the Commando Battalion to Mosul as part of Operation Iraqi Freedom. The unit together with other units from the Commando Battalion were responsible for base security and perimeter defense.

== Recruitment, selection and training ==
All members of the Albanian land forces can be considered for Commando forces training.Recruits test their psychological, physical and operational skills in carrying out special tasks.The Commando course lasts 3 months Some of the parts of the course program are: survival, ambush, reaction of the Commando Squad in patrolling in contact with the enemy, hostage rescue, object strike, precision shooting, as well as hand-to-hand combat.

== Equipment ==
Blue Berets
Pistols	Beretta Px4 Storm, FN Five-seveN, Glock 19, Heckler & Koch USP, Yavuz 16, Glock 19
Shotguns	Benelli M4 Super 90
Assault rifles	MPT-76, Beretta AR70/90, AKM
Machine guns	Heckler & Koch MG4, Heckler & Koch MG5
Sniper rifles	Sako TRG, Barrett M82, Heckler & Koch HK417
Vehicles	Land Rover Defender, Humvee
