= Air Force of the Albanian People's Army =

- Forcat Ajrore të Ushtrisë Popullore të Shqipërisë
- Fin flash of the Forcat Ajrore
- Active: 24 April 1951 – 1991
- Country: (People's Socialist Republic of Albania) Albania
- Type: Air force
- Role: Aerial warfare
- Size: 11,000 personnel
- Part of: Albanian People's Army
- Engagements: Greek Civil War; 1957 United States Air Force incursion into Albanian airspace

Commanders
- Notable commanders: Edip Ohri

Insignia
- Roundel

Aircraft flown
- Bomber: Ilyushin Il-28, Harbin H-5
- Fighter: Yak-9, MiG-15, MiG-17, MiG-19, Shenyang J-6, Shenyang J-5, Chengdu J-7
- Helicopter: Mi-1, Mi-4, Mi-8, Z-5
- Trainer: Yak-18, Yak-11, CJ-6
- Transport: Y-5, An-2

The Air Force of the Albanian People's Army (Albanian: Forcat Ajrore të Ushtrisë Popullore të Shqipërisë) (FASH), commonly known as the Albanian Air Force, was one of the three branches of the Albanian armed forces during the People's Socialist Republic of Albania. It was established in 1947 and existed until the dissolution of the People's Army in 1991.

== History ==
The Albanian People's Army Air Force was formed in 1947 with a gift of twelve Yakovlev Yak-3 fighters and a few Polikarpov Po-2 biplane trainers from the Soviet Union, with Soviet personnel seconded as instructors and advisers.

The Albanian Air Force was officially established on April 24, 1951. Its first aircraft were Soviet Yak-18 trainers produced after World War II and initially used at Laprakë on the outskirts of the Albanian capital of Tirana. A few years later, the Albanian Air Force would also be equipped with jet fighters. The first squadron of MiG-15 fighters, titled "Peza", was formed in 1955. This squadron was deployed at Kuçovo Airport.

Later, as part of military aid from the Soviet Union, the Albanian Air Force was also equipped with the MiG-17 and MiG-19.

After the Albanian–Soviet split ended the possibility of acquiring new Soviet planes, Albania's ally China supplied it with replacements and spare parts. According to former Albanian Air Force commander, Edip Ohri, China delivered a total of 100 combat aircraft including 70 MiG-17 and 12 MiG-19, with another batch of 95 MiG-19s delivered later. Additionally, the Chinese sent 12 An-2 transports, 36 helicopters, and four special purpose aircraft including a VIP transport plane for Enver Hoxha, although he never crossed the border since the plane was delivered. After 1970, the Albanians completely replaced their fleet of Soviet-built MiG-15 and MiG-17 aircraft with Chinese-built equivalents. The Chinese also supplied a squadron of J-7 fighters, the most modern aircraft in Albanian service at the time.

In June 1957, the first transport regiment was created, with three Mi-1 helicopters and three new Mi-4 helicopters, as well as some Yak-18 and Po-2 propeller planes. In 1967, this regiment was expanded in capacity with the arrival of 30 Harbin Z-5s (China's copy of the Mi-4).

Following the Sino-Albanian split, combat readiness of the fleet quickly declined with shortages of spare parts. The number of serviceable aircraft also shrank after the Chinese completely ceased their arms deliveries, leaving older aircraft in Albanian inventory unable to be repaired or replaced.

== Combat operations ==
=== First Operation ===
The first operation of FASH were undertaken by the Albanian anti-aircraft regiment units and they hit and shot down a Greek Spitfire fighter that had violated Albanian airspace for a spying mission. The Greek plane was destroyed and the pilot was found dead.

=== Second Operation ===
In August 1949, during the Albanian-Greek border incident, anti-aircraft units of the same regiment shot down another Greek plane. The plane was forced to land in a field, where it was captured by Albanian combat units. The Greek pilot was taken prisoner.

=== Third Operation ===
In April 1952, a Greek pilot, Nikos Akrivojanis, was captured by Albanian Air Force soldiers. He is said to have landed as he wanted to flee Greece because of the government but he was accused of being in Albania for a covert operation. He was tried on December 13, 1953 and executed on August 16, 1954.

=== First Albanian Air Force incident against the US Air Force ===
On December 23, 1957, an American Lockheed T-33 fighter jet violated Albanian airspace. Two MiG-15 aircraft took off from Kuçova airbase, piloted by Anastas Ngjela and Mahmut Hysa.

Major Howard J. Curran was intercepted and forced to land on the unfinished runway of the Rinas airport. The plane was seized and Curran was taken prisoner. He was later released on January 11, 1958, while the plane was placed in the Gjirokastër Fortress museum, where it is still today.

== Inventory ==
In 1989, the International Institute for Strategic Studies estimated that Albania had a total of 95 combat aircraft, but due the chronic shortage of spare parts, some aircraft weren't operational.

=== Air Force of the Albanian People's Army inventory (1989) ===
Aircraft	Origin	Number	Notes
Fighter
F-2	China	10	Chinese-built version of the MiG-15, used in the ground attack role.
F-4	China	35	Chinese-built version of the MiG-17, used in the ground attack role.
Shenyang F-6	China	30	Chinese-built version of the MiG-19.
Chengdu F-7	China	20	Chinese-built version of the MiG-21.
Transport
Ilyushin Il-14M	Soviet Union	3	
Lisunov Li-2	Soviet Union	6	Supplied by China.
Nanchang Y-5	China	10	Chinese-built version of the An-2.
Helicopter
Harbin Z-5	China	20	Chinese-built version of the Mi-4.
Trainer
MiG-15UTI	Soviet Union	6	
Nanchang CJ-5	China	8	Chinese-built version of the Yak-18.
Yakovlev Yak-11	Soviet Union	6	
