= List of Albanian Air Force aircraft =

Albanian military aircraft include all airplanes and helicopters which have been operated by the Albanian Air Force since its formal inception in 1947. Since Albania has no domestic aircraft manufacturing capacity, all aircraft have been procured from other countries. Additionally, the country's limited resources have meant that such procurement has been primarily through foreign military aid provided to Albania for strategic reasons. Initially, the Warsaw Pact provided equipment through the 1950s, but after a political rift, China supplanted them as the country's main benefactor. After the end of the Cold War and a significant shift in Albanian international relations, as well as a re-posturing of the Albanian Armed Forces, the air force has sought more modern support helicopters from Western Europe to support its new role in partnership with NATO.

The most up-to-date list of Albanian military aircraft can be found in the article Albanian Air Force.

== Cold War era aircraft ==
=== Founding years and the Warsaw Pact ===
In 1951, the Soviet Union provided the newly created Air Force of the Albanian People's Army with obsolete Yak-9 fighters and Po-2 trainer aircraft. A small batch of newly built Yak-18 trainer aircraft was also delivered.

As a founding member of the Warsaw Pact, Albania received MiG-15 fighter and trainer aircraft in 1955. Additional aircraft were supplied by the Soviets until the Albanian-Soviet split in 1961. In 1963, it was estimated the Albanians operated two squadrons of Soviet-built MiG-15 and MiG-17, and several Soviet transport and trainer aircraft.

Aircraft	Notes
Fighters
Yakovlev Yak-9	Second-hand, 12 delivered in 1951.
MiG-15	Second-hand, 24 MiG-15bis delivered in 1955 and 8 Chinese-built F-2 in 1956.
MiG-19	Second-hand, 3 MiG-19 and 12 MiG-19PM delivered in 1959.
Bomber
Ilyushin Il-28	1 delivered in 1957.
Helicopters
Mil Mi-1	2 delivered in 1957.
Mil Mi-4	4 Mi-4A delivered in 1957.
Transport
Ilyushin Il-14	1 delivered in 1957; in 1963, Czechoslovakia delivered 1 Avia-14T, while East Germany delivered 2 VEP-14P.
Trainers
Polikarpov Po-2	Second-hand, 5 delivered in 1951.
Yakovlev Yak-18	4 delivered in 1951; 6 Yak-18A delivered in 1959.
Yakovlev Yak-11	6 delivered in 1954.
MiG-15UTI	4 delivered in 1955; another 4 Czechoslovak-built, plus 4 Chinese-built FT-2 delivered in 1956.

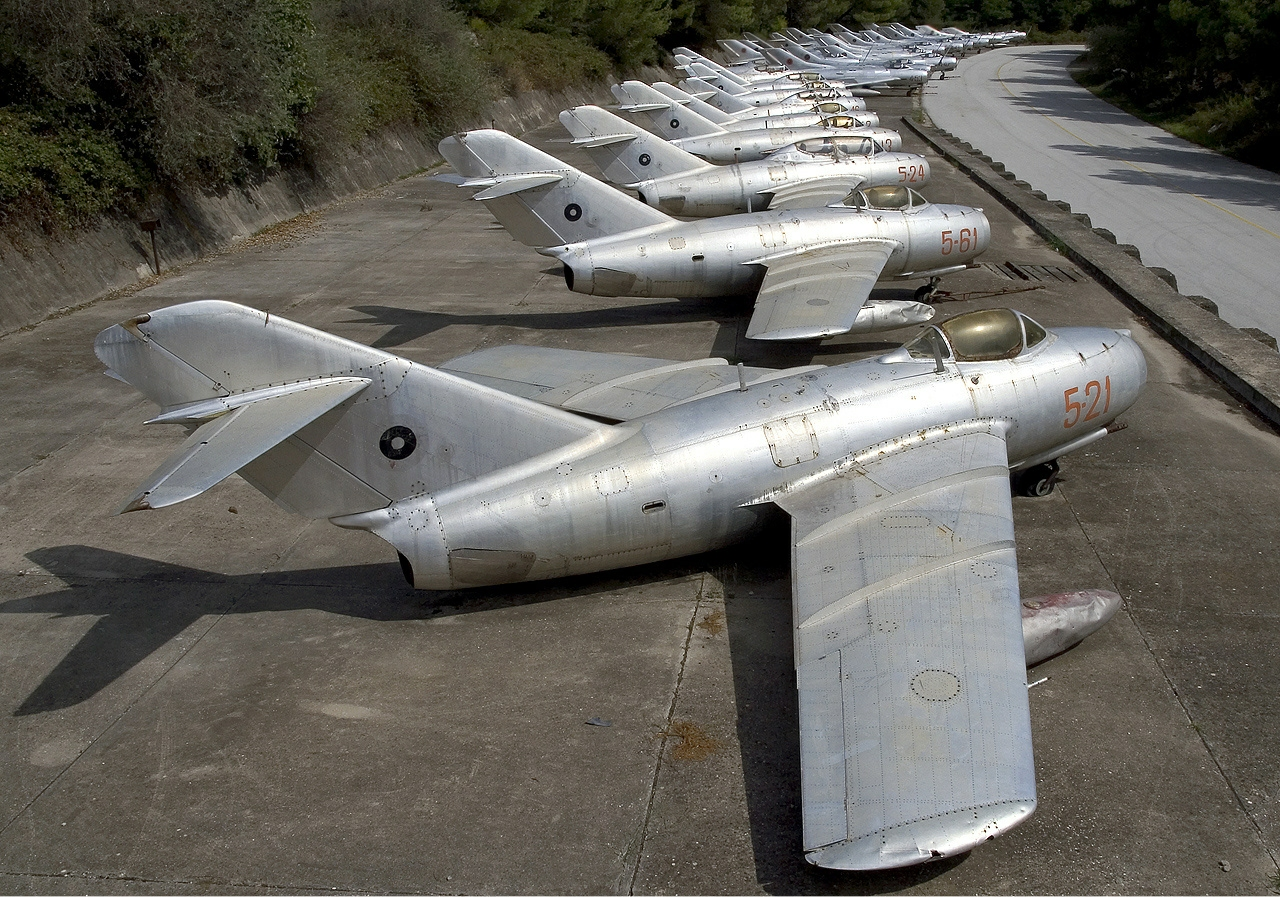
Albanian MiG-15bis

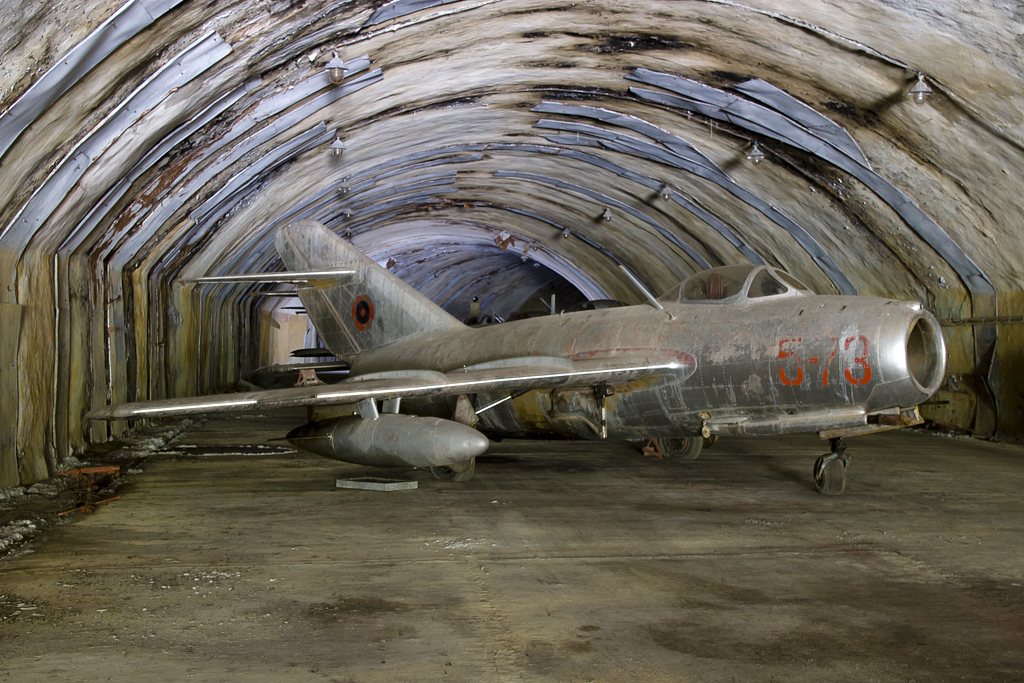
Albanian F-2

=== Chinese assistance ===
After 1970 the Albanian Air Force completely replaced its fleet of Soviet MiG-15s and MiG-17s with Chinese equivalents. According to former Albanian Air Force commander, Edip Ohri, China delivered a total of 100 combat aircraft including 70 F-5 (MiG-17) and 12 F-6 (MiG-19), with another batch of 95 F-6s delivered later. Most of the Albanian fighters were limited to daytime operations, lacking the radars and avionics necessary to operate in night and all-weather operations. The Chinese also supplied the Albanians with an F-7 (MiG-21) squadron. These were the most modern aircraft in the Albanian Air Force.

Additional aircraft supplied included 12 Y-5 (An-2) transports, 36 helicopters, and four special purpose aircraft including a VIP transport Il-14 for Enver Hoxha, although he never crossed the border after the plane was delivered. Chinese-supplied Li-2 transports were also used.

After China started reducing the deliveries of spare parts to Albania in 1976 (due the Sino-Albanian split), combat readiness of the Albanian Air Force quickly declined. Once China completely ceased its arms deliveries, the inventory of aircraft shrunk, with older aircraft being unable to be repaired or replaced.

In 2016, Albania put 40 of its remaining Soviet and Chinese aircraft in storage for auction. Due bureaucratic red tape they were still stored for sale in 2019.

Aircraft	Notes
Fighters
Shenyang J-5	12 delivered in 1962.
Shenyang J-6	71 (including the FT-6 trainer version) delivered between 1965 and 1971, partly in exchange for MiG-19PMs.
Chengdu J-7	12 delivered in 1962.
Bomber
Harbin H-5	1 B-5 delivered in 1971.
Transports
Nanchang Y-5	13 delivered between 1963 and 1964.
Helicopters
Harbin Z-5	37 delivered between 1967 and 1971.
Trainers
Shenyang FT-2	11 delivered between 1965 and 1966.
Shenyang FT-5	8 delivered in 1961.
Nanchang CJ-6	10 BT-6 delivered between 1963 and 1964; 10 BT-6A delivered in 1967, with an additional 10 delivered in 1971.

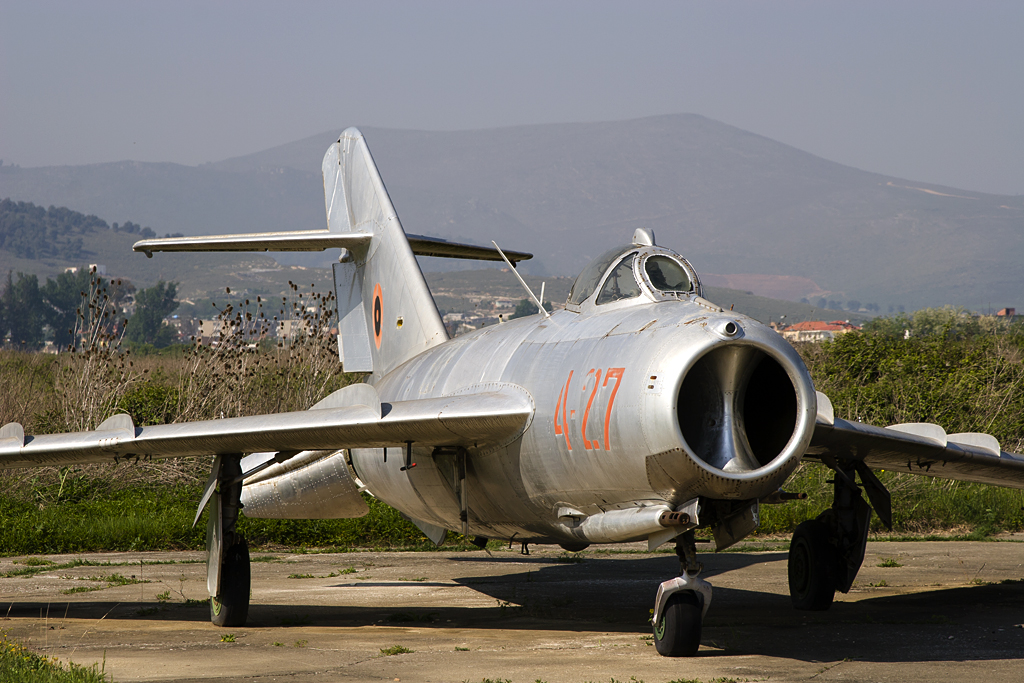
Albanian F-5

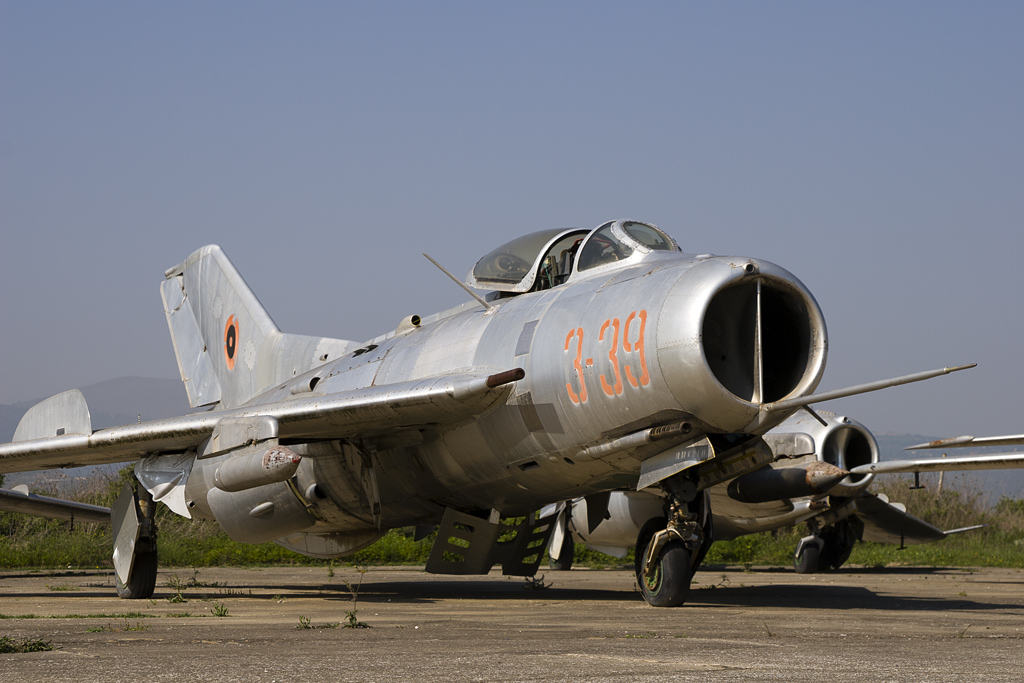
Albanian F-6

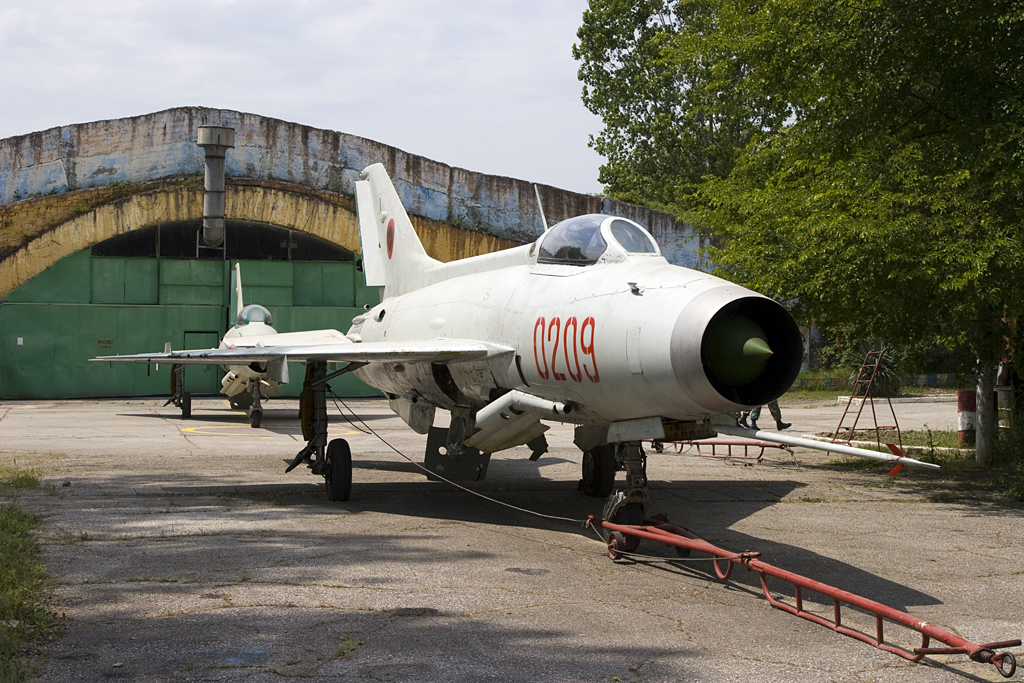
A pair of Albanian F-7s

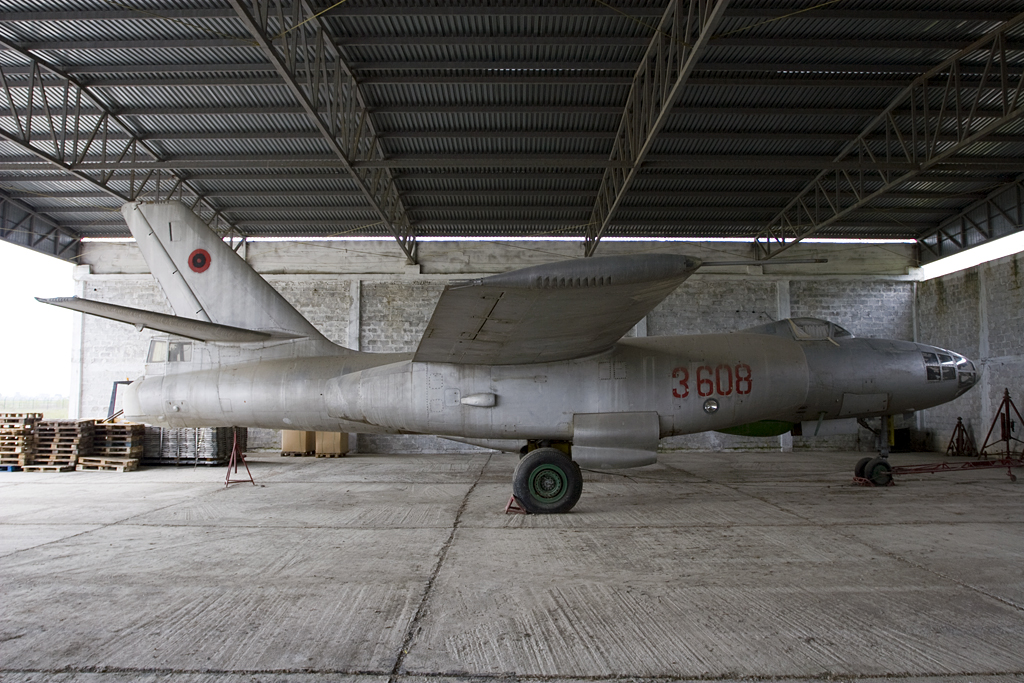
Albanian B-5
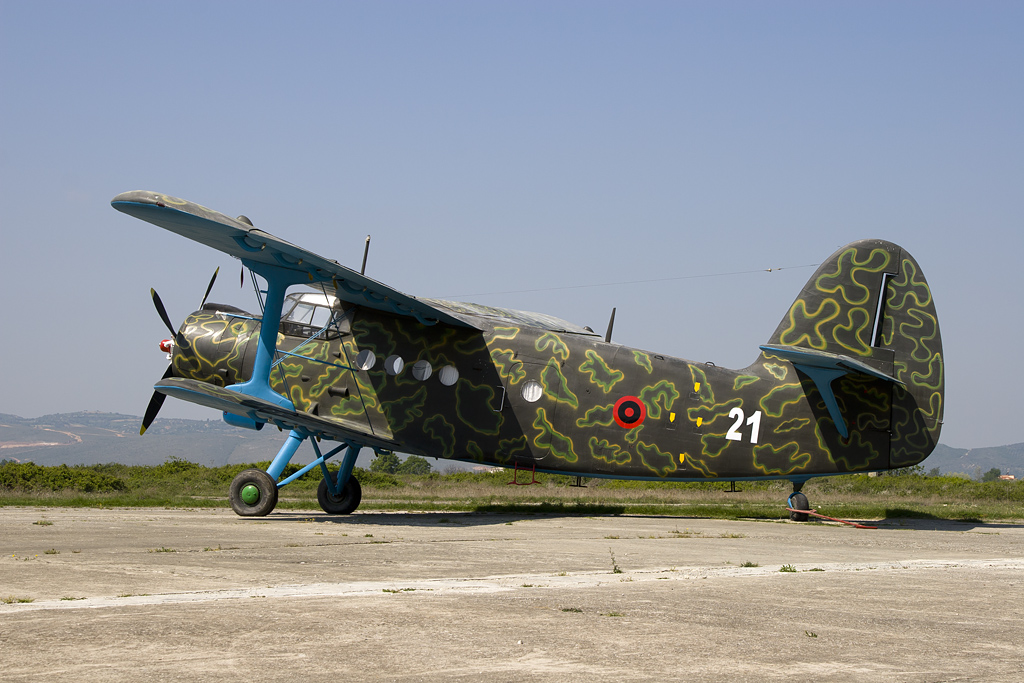
Albanian Y-5

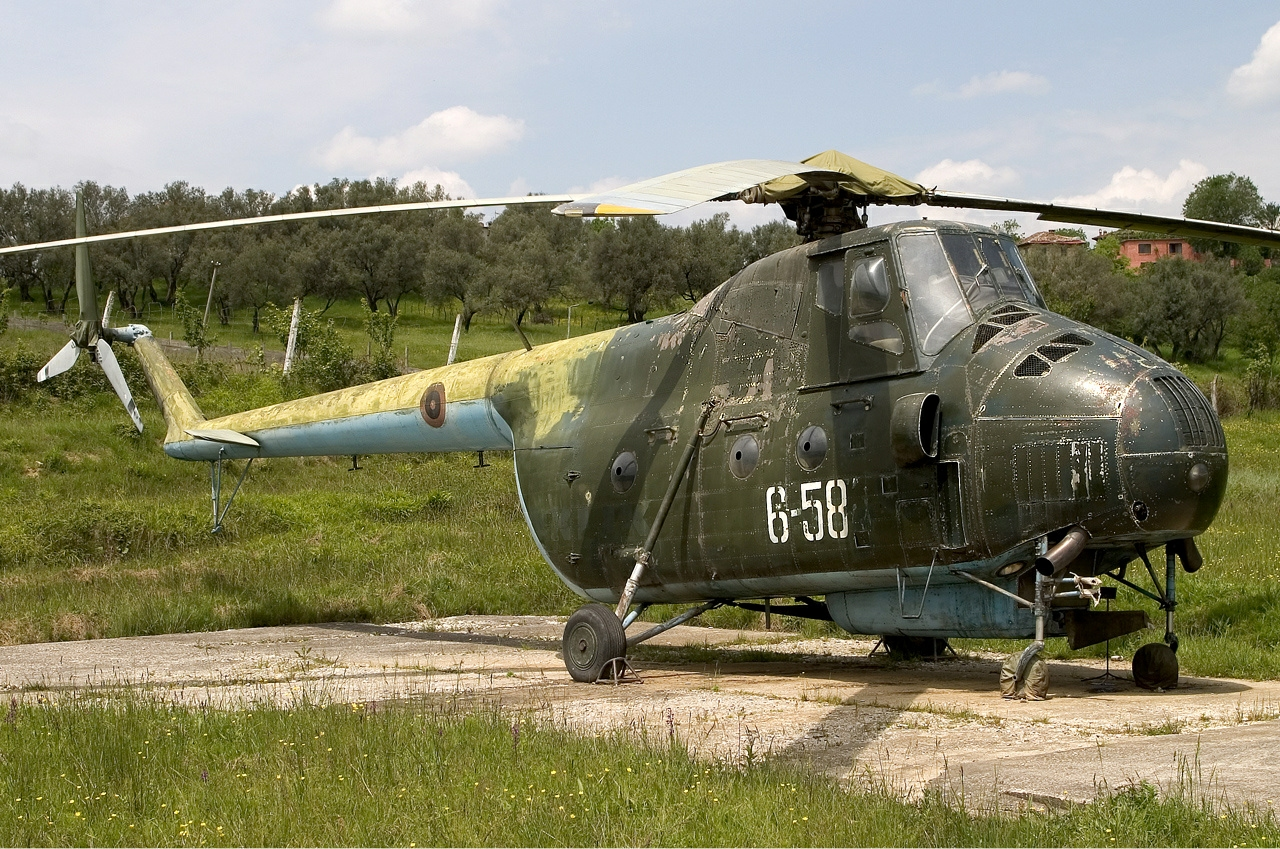
Albanian Z-5

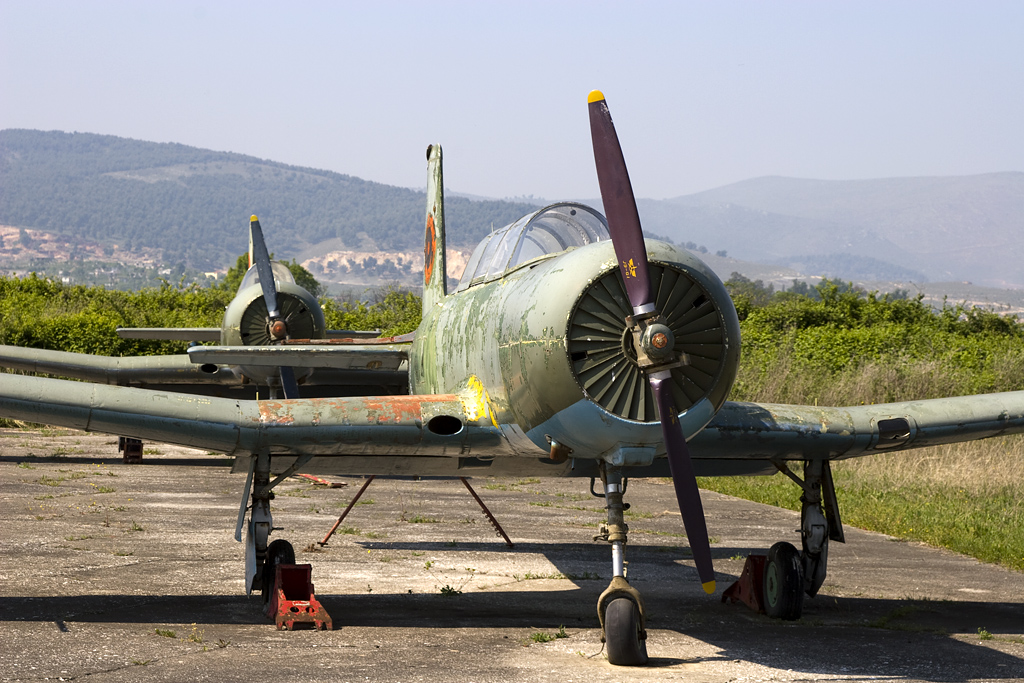
Two Albanian CJ-6

== Post-communist era aircraft ==
In 2005, the Albanian Ministry of Defence decided to retire its fixed-wing aircraft squadrons, due their poor condition and the nation's limited resources. With the country on the verge of joining NATO (reducing the risk of any immediate aerial threats), the Albanian MoD decided to focus on the development of a helicopter force to support the Land Forces.

In 2010, the Albanian Air Force operated Bell 205, Bell 206, AW109 and MBB Bo 105 helicopters. In 2014, Germany delivered two EC145 helicopters Albania had purchased and France completed delivery of a batch of four AS-532AL attack helicopters. In 2022, Albania purchased Bayraktar TB2s drones from Turkey, to be operated from the Kuçovë Aerodrome. In October 2024, Prime Minister Edi Rama announced the Turkey will supply Albania with a "considerable" amount of kamikaze drones, without disclosing the exact number of systems or specific model of drone.

Aircraft	Notes
Helicopters
Bell 205	7 second-hand Agusta Bell-205A1 delivered by Italy in 2005 as a gift.
Bell 206	7 second-hand Agusta Bell-206C-1 gifted by Italy in 2003.
MBB Bo 105	6 second-hand but modernized before delivery to the Bo-105E4 standard. Delivered by Germany in 2006.
Eurocopter AS532 Cougar	4 AS-532AL delivered by France between 2012 and 2014.
Eurocopter EC145	2 delivered in 2015 by Germany.
Unmanned aerial vehicles
Bayraktar TB2	3 purchased from Turkey in 2022.
Unknown loitering munition	To be delivered by Turkey.

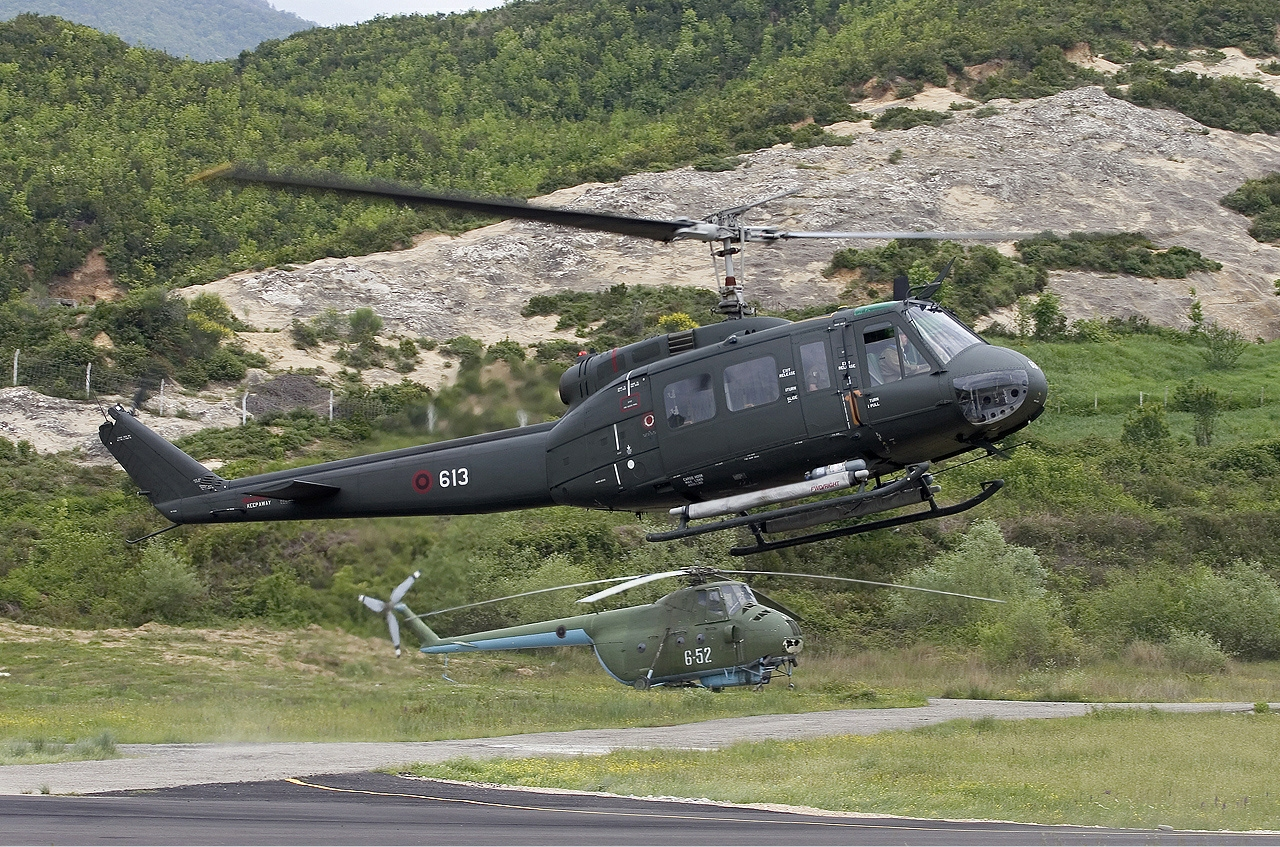
An Albanian AB-205A1 (front) with a Z-5 helicopter (behind)

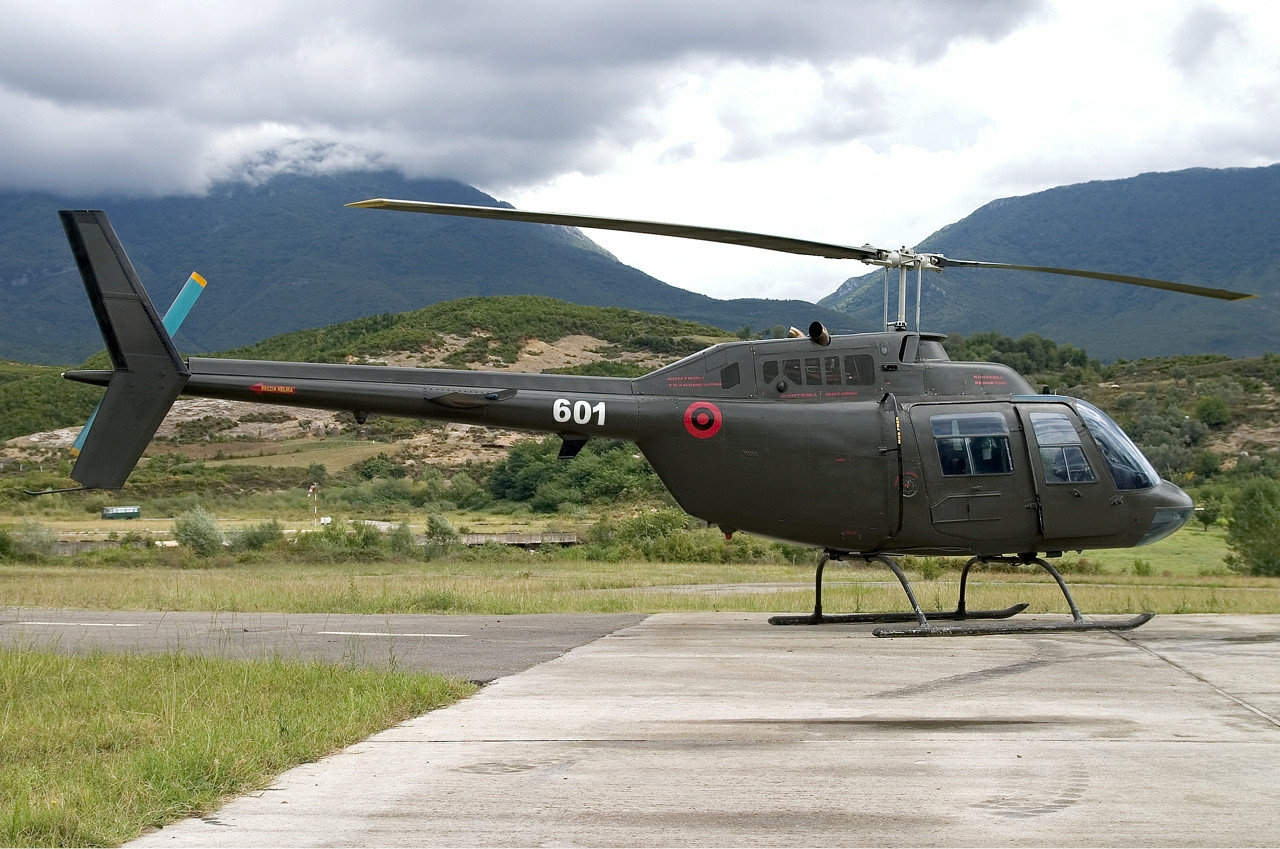
An Albanian Agusta Bell-206C-1

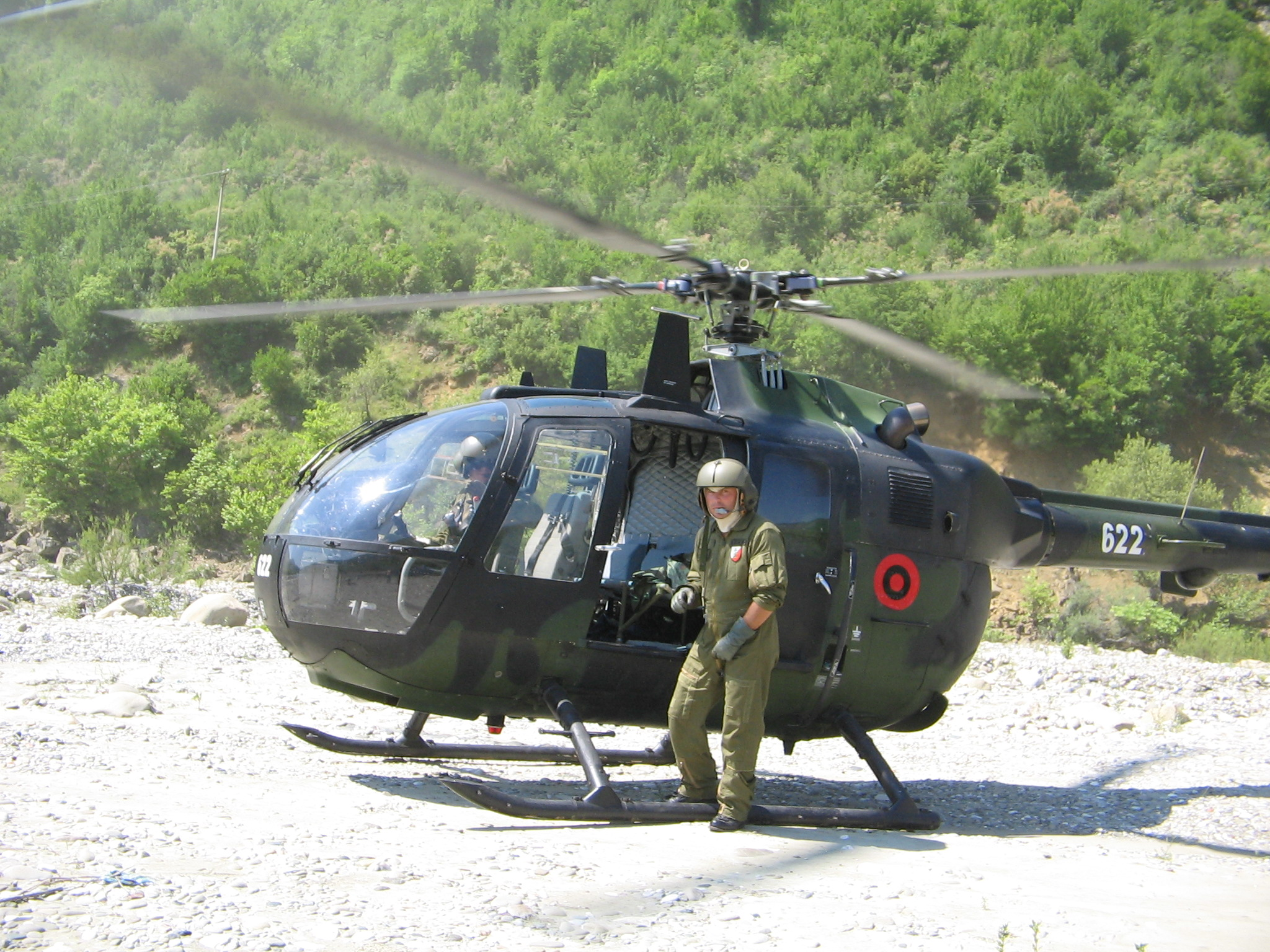
An Albanian Bo 105

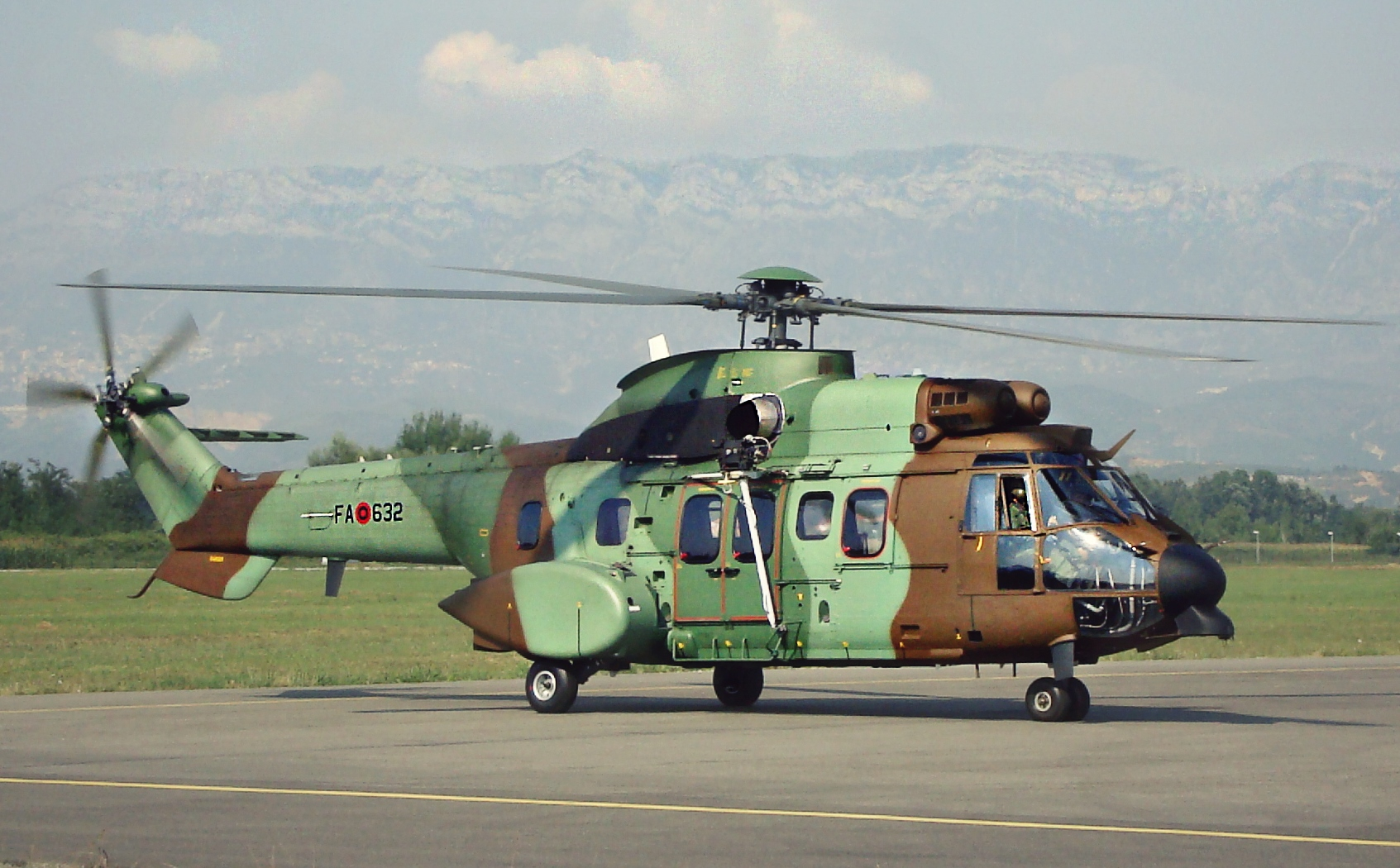
An Albanian Cougar

== See also ==
- Albanian Air Force
- List of air forces

== Bibliography ==
- Bytyçi, Enver (2022). In the Shadows of Albania-China Relations (1960-1978). Cambridge Scholars Publishing. ISBN 978-1-5275-7909-5.
- Keefe, Eugene K.; Foreign Area Studies, American University (1971). Area Handbook for Albania. Washington, DC: U.S. Government Printing Office.
- Meijer, Hugo; Wyss, Marco, eds. (2018). The Handbook of European Defence Policies and Armed Forces. Oxford University Press. ISBN 978-0-19-250774-7.
- Steinberg, S. H., ed. (2016). The Statesman's Year-Book 1963: The One-Volume ENCYCLOPAEDIA of all nations (100th ed.). London: Springer. ISBN 978-0-230-27092-3.
- Wragg, David (2011). The World Air Power Guide. Casemate Publishers. ISBN 978-1-84468-784-8.
- Zickel, Raymond E.; Iwaskiw, Walter R.; Keefe, Eugene K. (1992). Albania: A Country Study (PDF). Washington, DC: Federal Research Division, Library of Congress.
