= Vladimir Avdiaj =

Albanian general

Brigadier General Vladimir Veip Avdiaj
- Born: July 26, 1961 (age 64); Tirana, Albania
- Allegiance: People's Socialist Republic of Albania (1984–1992); Republic of Albania (1992–present)
- Branch: Albanian People's Army (1984–1992); Albanian Air Force (1992–present)
- Service years: 1984–present
- Rank: Brigadier General
- Commands: Commander, Albanian Air Force

Vladimir Veip Avdiaj (born 1961) is a Brigadier General in the Albanian Air Force serving as the current commander of the Albanian Air Force, a post he has held since 20 August 2015. He was appointed to hold the post by President Bujar Nishani. He has served continuously in the Albanian military from 1984.

== Education and career ==
Avdiaj first studied at the Albanian Air Force Academy, where he graduated in 1984; he has also studied at the United States Army War College where he obtained a master's in strategic studies. He was one of the first Albanian military members to train in the United States. He specialized as a fighter pilot, and has held posts in the Ministry of Defense since 2008. Most of his past military command posts were located at Rinas Air Force Base, where he was mainly responsible for air navigation and base security.

Internationally, Avdiaj has also been a representative to the North Atlantic Treaty Organization on the behalf of Albania, a posting he held from 2014 to 2015.

== Personal life ==
Avdiaj is married, and has two children.
