= Albanian Aviation Regiment 4020 =

Unit of the Albanian People's Air Force

The Aviation Regiment 4020 was the bomber regiment of the Albanian People's Air Force.

== History ==
Aviation Regiment 4020 operated one Il-28 acquired in 1957 attached to 2 Skuadrilja (2nd Squadron). This aircraft was traded for an H-5, the Chinese version of the Soviet Il-28, in 1971 and retired from service in 1992.

The Aviation Regiment 4020 was Europe's last operator of the Harbin H-5. The last role the H-5 played in the Albanian Air Force was a target tug.

== Inventory ==
Aircraft	Origine	Number	Variant	Notes
Harbin H-5	China	1		
Il-14 "Crate"	USSR	3		

== Gallery ==
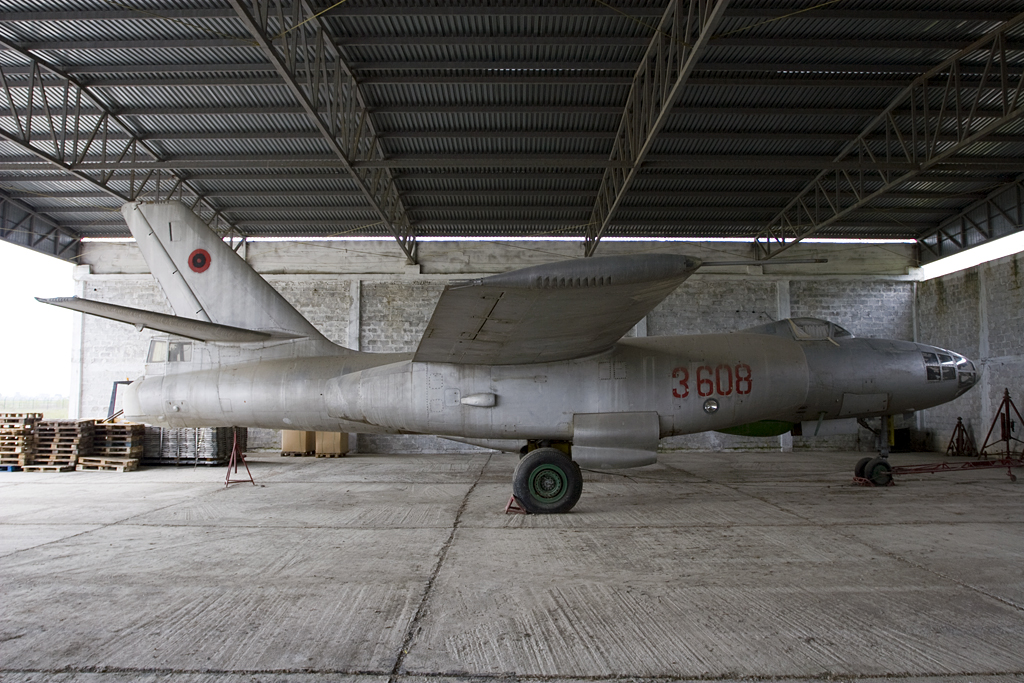

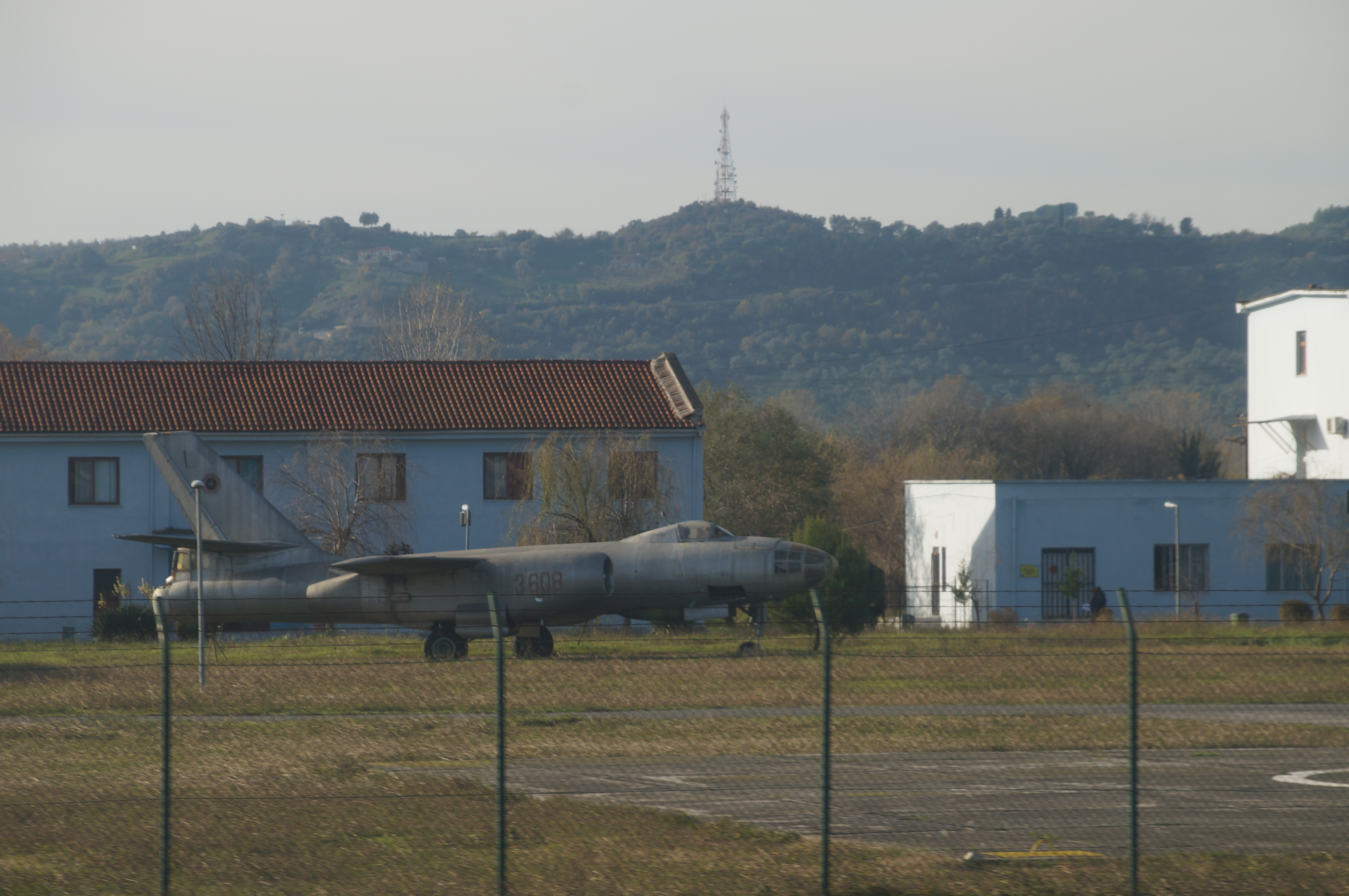
