= 1957 United States Air Force incursion into Albanian airspace =

Cold War incident

- Part of The Cold War
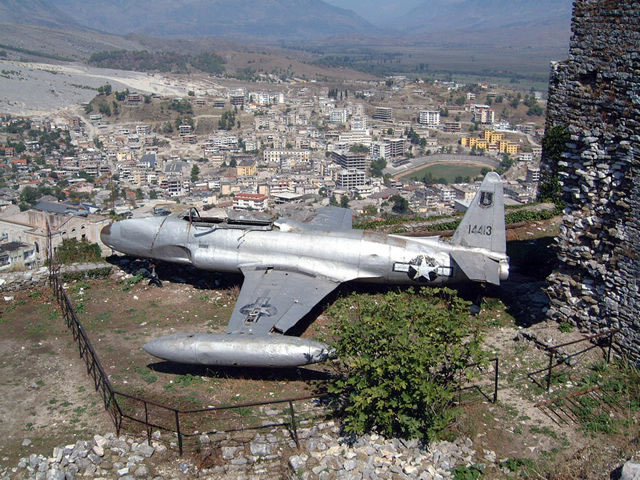
- The USAF Lockheed T-33 fighter jet at Gjirokastër
Date	December 23, 1957
Location	Rinas, Albania 40.0737°N 20.14013°E
Result	Albanian Victory: Aircraft seized; American pilot arrested but later released

Belligerents
Albania	United States

Commanders and leaders
(Albania) Anastas Ngjela	(United States) / Howard J. Curran (POW)

Units involved
Air Force of the Albanian People's Army	United States Air Force

Strength
2 MiG-15	1 Lockheed T-33

Casualties and losses
None	1 T-33 captured

The 1957 United States Air Force incursion into Albanian airspace (Albanian: Incidentet e para ajrore), was a Cold War air-to-air combat incident.

On December 23, 1957, an American T-33 fighter jet violated Albanian airspace. Two MiG-15 aircraft took off from Kuçova Air Base, piloted by Anastas Ngjela and Mahmut Hysa.

The American fighter jet was surrounded and forced to land on the unfinished runway at Rinas airport, now known as Tirana International Airport Nënë Tereza. The plane was impounded and the American pilot Major Howard J. Curran was arrested. Curran was released on January 11, 1958, while the plane was placed in the Gjirokastër Fortress museum. The T-33 air incident was just one of at least eight that occurred between Albania and foreign powers from 1948 to the late 1970s.
