= Albanian Air Force =

Air warfare branch of Albania's armed forces

- Forca Ajrore e Republikës së Shqipërisë
- Emblem of the Albanian Air Force
- Founded: 1928; 98 years ago
- Country: Albania
- Type: Air force
- Role: Aerial warfare
- Size: 650 Personnel
- Part of: Albanian Armed Forces
- Equipment: 21 helicopters 9 UAVs

Commanders
- Commander: Brigadier General Edmond Voci

Insignia
- Roundel

- Flag

Aircraft flown
- Helicopter: UH-60 Black Hawk, AS532 Cougar, H145, BO-105, AW109, Bell 205, Bell 206, Bell 505
- Reconnaissance: Bayraktar TB2

The Albanian Air Force (Albanian: Forca Ajrore e Republikës së Shqipërisë - Air Force of the Republic of Albania) is the air force of Albania and one of the branches of the Albanian Armed Forces.

== History ==
=== Early history ===
In 1914 the government of Albania ordered three Lohner Daimler aircraft from Austria to form an air force. As a result of the outbreak of World War I, the order was cancelled. Albania did not have the resources to start the development of a proper Air Force during the 1920s and 1930s. After the establishment of the Albanian Kingdom in 1928, King Zog formed the Royal Albanian Air Corps under the direction of the Royal Albanian Army.

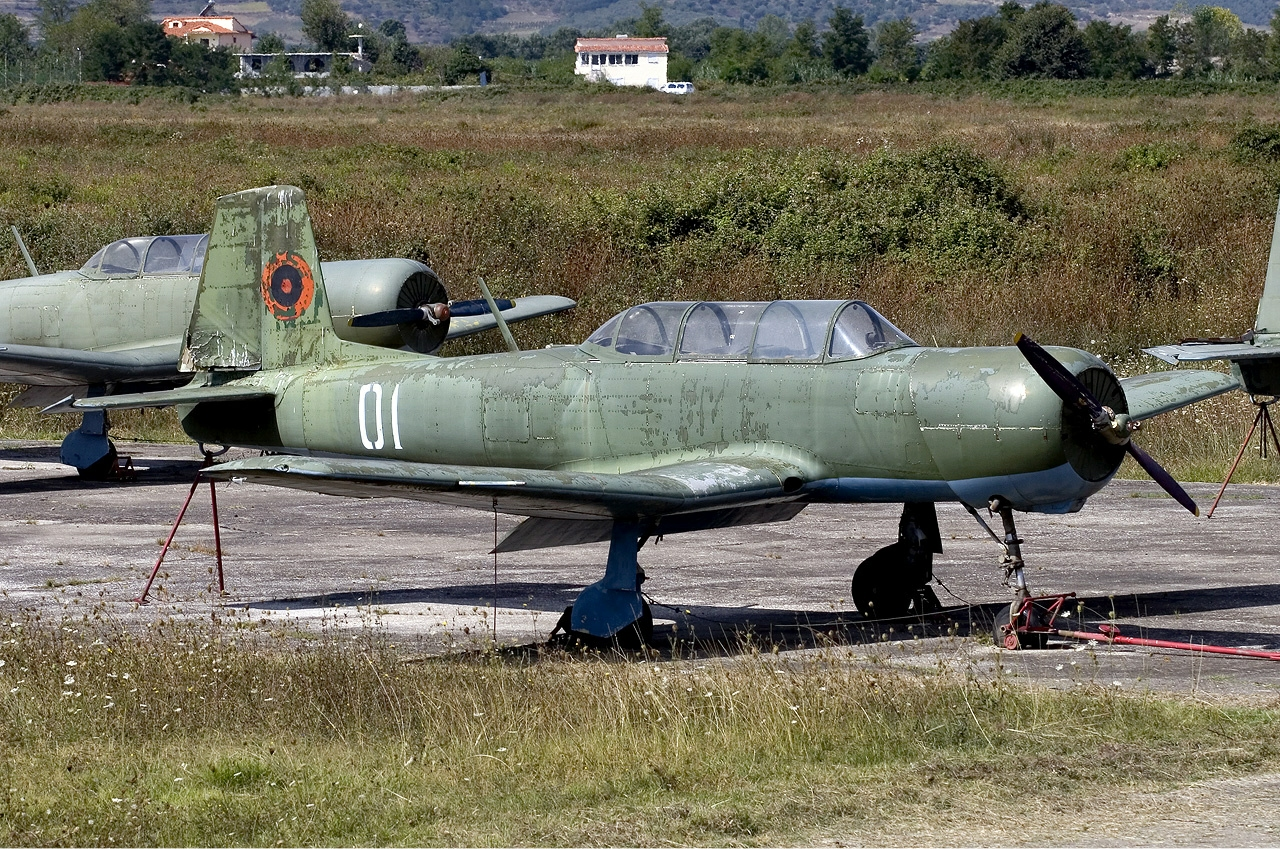
An Albanian air force PT-6

After its launch, the group was provided with four Albatros C.XV/L.47s and one Albatros C.XV/L.47b, but they were never put into full service.

The Royal Air Force, and the rest of Albanian armed forces, were abolished following the Italian invasion of Albania.

=== Socialist Albania ===
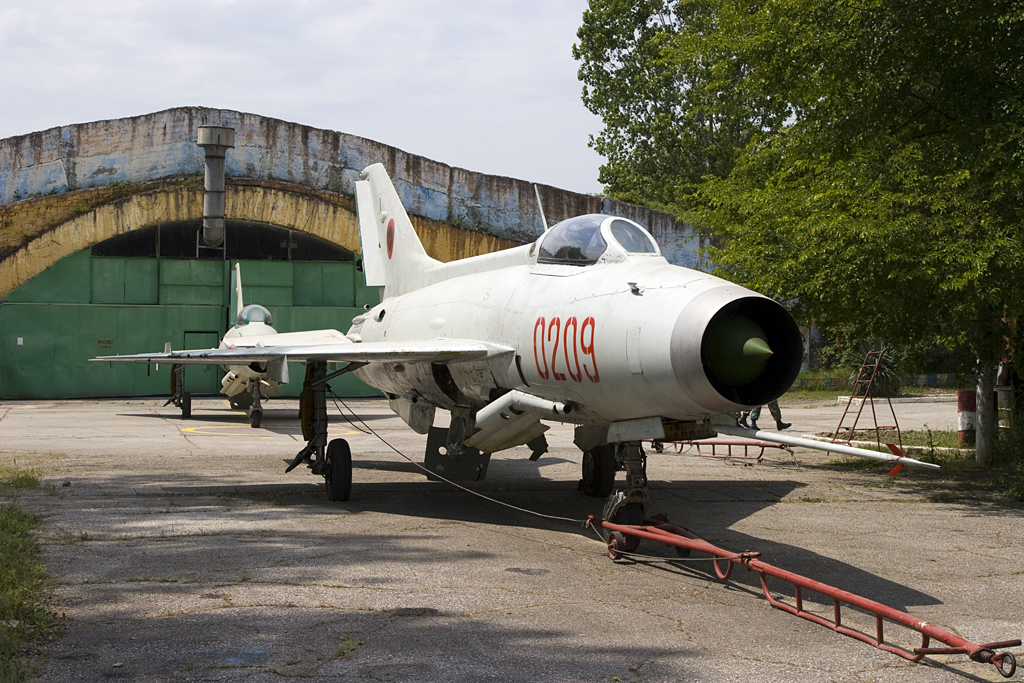
Chengdu F-7s of the Albanian Air Force parked outside the hangar at Tirana airport

After World War II, the Albanian Air Force finally came into existence on 24 April 1951 when Albania was equipped with Soviet aircraft. The first squadron was equipped with Yak-9Ps. The first jet fighter to enter service was the MiG-15bis, entering service on 15 May 1955, followed by the MiG-17F. Some of the MiG-15s were Soviet fighters used and then withdrawn from the North Korean Air Force. The MiG-19 became the backbone of the Albanian Air Force. 12 MiG-19PM were delivered by the USSR in October 1959 and in the same year pilots and specialists were sent in the USSR to obtain training for the new aircraft. An academy was founded in Vlorë in 1962. Albania cut diplomatic ties with the Soviet Union in 1962, leading to a shift to China for the supply of necessary parts to maintain its MiGs. After the collapse of USSR-Albanian relations, significant numbers of Shenyang J-6 fighters (Chinese copy of the MiG-19S), were acquired from China. In the early 1970s, Albania exchanged its lot of MiG-19PM fighters with 12 more advanced, Chengdu J-7A fighters (Chinese copy of the Soviet-built MiG-21). Two of them were lost in incidents in the early 1970s and eight had problems with lack of batteries in the early 1980s.

In total, during the 70s and early 80s, the equipment of the Albanian Air Force consisted of 142 Shenyang J-6Cs, 12 Chengdu J-7As, a fighter squadron equipped with MiG-17s, a considerable number of MiG-15 (both BIS and UTI versions), and 4 Soviet-made Il-14 transport aircraft. A squadron of Shijiazhuang Y-5 was deployed in Tirana and the Air Force Academy in Vlora had two squadrons of Yak-18 for basic pilot training purposes. The helicopter component consisted in 18 Harbin Z-5 (Chinese copy of Mil Mi-4) helicopters based in Farka Tirana, meanwhile there was a single prototype of a light Harbin H-5 bomber based in Rinas.

Due to the collapse of relations between Albania and the Chinese, maintenance became extremely difficult and the number of deadly incidents involving Mikoyan fighters increased. Despite Albanian efforts and some initial success in repairing the engines of the MiGs, the lack of specific jet fuel forced authorities to start production locally, resulting in low-quality production. The first attempt was in 1961, when the Kuçova factory produced the special jet fuel (a derivative of kerosene called TS-1). The fuel shortened the lifespan of the jet engines and was often blamed as the main reason for several deadly incidents. 35 Albanian pilots lost their lives from 1955 to 2005, mainly due to mechanical failures with the MiG aircraft.

=== Recent history ===
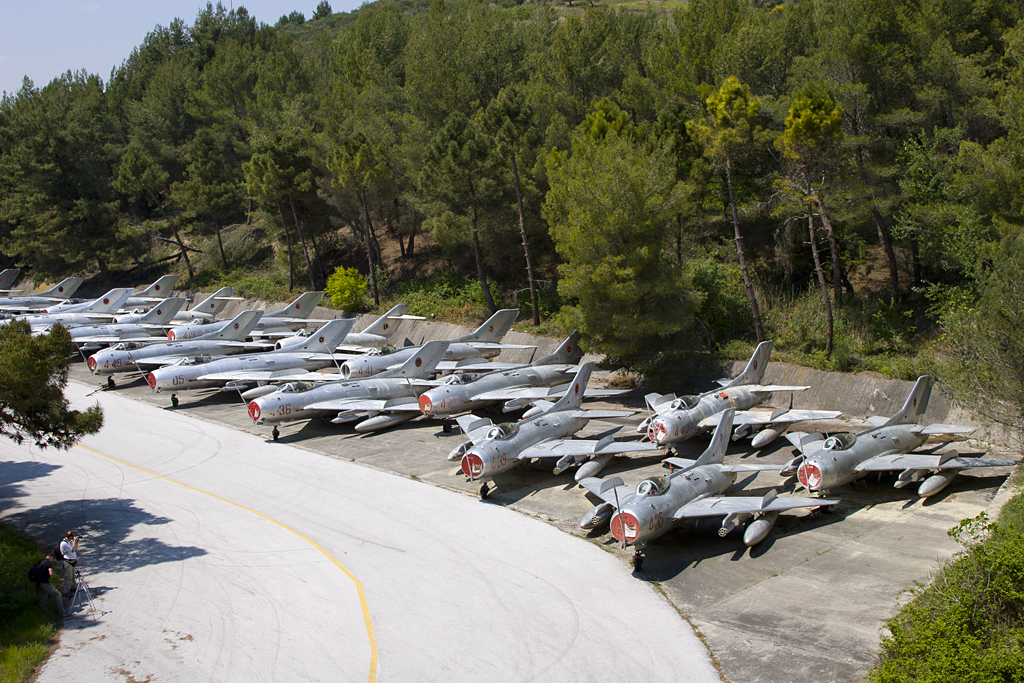
Shenyang F-6 jet fighters of the Albanian Airforce parked at Kuçovë

Following the fall of communism in Albania in 1990, the air force had 200 jets and 40 helicopters, and four Il-14 transport planes. In the early 1990s, 7594 Regiment became Aviation Regiment 4020, seemingly with its 1st Squadron of fighter aircraft and 2nd Squadron of Shenyang FT-5s, and Shijiazhuang Y-5s (Antonov An-2s). During the 1997 uprising in Albania, seven aircraft of the airforce were destroyed and their parts were stolen. In the early 90s, in an effort to keep the fighter jets flying, the Albanian Air Force received spare parts from Bulgaria and engines from the ex-GDR. By 2004, Albania still had 117 J-6C aircraft, (although most were not operational) and only 12 J-7A. The Albanian fighter jets were finally withdrawn from active service in late 2004 after the last deadly incident involving a J-6C which crashed during take-off from the military area at Mother Teresa Airport in Tirana.

By 2006, Albania had scrapped over half of its Z-5s and had signed a contract for the delivery of six Bolkow 105s over three years. This acquisition allowed air force to operate with 4 Shijiazhuang Y-5s, 7 B206s, 3 B205s, 6 Bolkow 105s. Currently, the Albanian Air Brigade does not operate any Soviet-era aircraft. Since 2011, 9 Shijiazhuang Y-5 have been retired from service. In 2011, the air force sold four Il-14 transport planes for scrap.

In 2016, 40 retired Albanian military aircraft were prepared for auction at a future date. The aircraft for sale include a military trainer aircraft, the Yak-18, and four types of military jets – MiG-15s, MiG-17s, MiG-19s, and MiG-21s – and four Mi-4 transport helicopters. The government said there has been interest from collectors and museums, and that it will sell another 100 jets if the auction is successful. The funds generated were used to further modernise the Air Force.

== Retired aircraft ==
=== Fighter / Attacker ===
Image	Aircraft	Origin	Type	Total 168-184 Aircraft	Notes	Regiment	In service
	Chengdu F-7A	China	Jet fighter	12	In the 1970s 1 F-7A pilot accidentally entered Yugoslav airspace during a training drill, was intercepted by 2 Yugoslav Mig-21 and was forced to land in Kosovo, when landing the Yugoslav Mig-21 deployed their parachutes to stop but the Albanian F-7A pilot activated full afterburner took off and escaped back to Albania.	Part of Aviation Regiment 4020 (1970–1974) and Aviation Regiment 4010 (1974–2004)	1970-2004
	MiG-19PM	Soviet Union	Jet fighter	12	Albania–Yugoslav aircraft incident (1967)	Part of Aviation Regiment 4020 Replaced by J-6	1959-1965
	MiG-17F	Soviet Union	Jet fighter	12	12 Mig-17 delivered 1962	Part of Aviation Regiment 4030	1962-?
	MiG-15 and MIG-15 UTI	Soviet Union	Jet fighter	32-48+	8+ Mig-15UTI and 24+ MIg-15bis. In 1957 2 Mig-15 captured an American T-33 and its pilot that violated Albanian Airspace.	Part of Aviation Regiment 4020, 4030 and 4004	1955-2000
	Shenyang F-6 and FT-6	China	Jet fighter	65-71+	Chinese variant of Mig-19.	Part of Aviation Regiment 4010, 4020 and 4030	1965-2004
	Shenyang F-5 and Shenyang FT-5	China	Jet fighter	35+	13 F-5 and 22 FT-5	Part of Aviation Regiment 4010 4020 and 4030	1970-2004

=== Bombers ===
Image	Aircraft	Origin	Type	Total 1 Aircraft	Units	Regiment	In service
	Harbin H-5	China	Bomber	1	Aviation Regiment 4020 operated 1	Part of Aviation Regiment 4020	Retired
	Ilyushin Il-28	Soviet Union	Bomber	1	operated 1 but traded it for 1 Harbin H-5	Part of Aviation Regiment 4020	Retired

=== Helicopters ===
Image	Aircraft	Origin	Type	Total 80+ Aircraft	Units	Regiment	In service
	Bell 212	United States	Helicopter		Unknown		Retired
	Eurocopter AS350 Écureuil	France	Helicopter		Unknown	Part of Aviation Regiment 4050	Retired
	Harbin Z-5	China	Helicopter	37	Z-5 of those 31 were Z-5A variants and 6 were Z-5D.	Part of Aviation Regiment 4040	Retired
	Mil Mi-1	Soviet Union	Helicopter	2	2 units delivered 1957	Part of Aviation Regiment 4050	Retired
	Mil Mi-4	Soviet Union	Helicopter	41	41 Mil Mi-4 but 1 was lost in an accident	Part of Aviation Regiment 4040 and 4050	Retired
	Mil Mi-8T	Soviet Union	Helicopter		Unknown Mil Mi-8T		Possible in service

=== Trainer ===
Image	Aircraft	Origin	Type	Total 208 Aircraft	Units	Regiment	In service
	Yakovlev Yak-9	Soviet Union	Propeller fighter	84	72 aircraft and 12 Yak-9V trainer	Part of Aviation Regiment 4050	Retired
	Yakovlev Yak-18	Soviet Union	Trainer	10	4 Yak-18 delivered 1951 and 6 Yak-18A delivered 1959	Part of Aviation Regiment 4050	Retired
	Yakovlev Yak-11	Soviet Union	Trainer	6	6 Received in 1953	Part of Aviation Regiment 4050	Retired
	Nanchang CJ-6	China	Trainer	30	10 BT-6, 20 BT-6A	Part of Aviation Regiment 4004	Retired
	Polikarpov Po-2	Soviet Union	Trainer	78	78 Aircraft received between 1950 and 1966	Part of Aviation Regiment 4050	Retired 1985

=== Transport ===
Image	Aircraft	Origin	Type	Total 4+ Aircraft	Units	Regiment	In service
	Ilyushin Il-14	Soviet Union	Transport	4	4 Units, 2x Il-14 from Soviet Union, 1x Avia 14T from Czechoslovakia, 1x VEB Il-14P from East Germany.	Part of Aviation Regiment 4020 and 4050	Retired 2002
	Lisunov Li-2	Soviet Union	Transport		Unknown		Retired
	Shijiazhuang Y-5 (or Nanchang Y-5)	China	Transport		Unknown	Part of Aviation Regiment 4020 and 4050	Retired

== Current Equipment ==
=== Aircraft ===
The Albanian Air Force has retired all of its fixed-wing aircraft and now operates several types of helicopters.

Image	Aircraft	Origin	Type	In service	Notes
	Helicopters				
	Eurocopter AS532 Cougar	France; United Kingdom	Utility helicopter	4	On 17 December 2009, the Ministry of Defense signed a contract worth 78,633,288 Euros with Eurocopter for the purchase of 5 Eurocopter AS532 AL Cougar helicopters. The types consist of 1 VIP, 1 SAR, 1 medical evacuation, and 2 troop transportation helicopters. After the VIP helicopter crash in 2012 in the French Alps, in 2013, the Albanian side asked Eurocopter (now Airbus) to cancel the arrival of the last helicopter and its conversion to two light Eurocopter EC145M helicopters.
	Airbus H145	France; Germany; Japan	Utility helicopter	2	Initially, the Ministry of Defence decided in 2011 to buy 1 Eurocopter EC145 helicopter VIP variant that will serve as an air transport for the heads of state. The contract was signed on 29 March 2011 with Eurocopter worth €5,350,000. In 2014, the new government after an accident during a test in the French Alps with an AS532 AL Cougar VIP built for AAF, decided to renegotiate the contract by replacing the Cougar helicopter with 2 Eurocopter EC145M SAR. On April 6, 2016, one of the two EC145M SAR helicopters of the Albanian Air Force crashed into Lake Skadar, where two pilots were killed during a training operation.
	AgustaWestland AW109C	Italy	Utility / VIP transport	1	Used for VIP transport.
	Bell 505 Jet Ranger X	United States	Utility helicopter	2	Two Bell 505 Jet Ranger X helicopters were observed in Albanian Air Force markings while transiting through Graz, Austria, prior to delivery to Albania.
	MBB Bo 105E-4	West Germany	Utility helicopter	4	On 3 April 2006, the final contract for the delivery of 12 Bölkow-Blom MBB BO-105 lightweight twin-engine multi-role helicopters to the Republic of Albania was signed in Tirana between the Albanian Ministry of Defence and Eurocopter Deutschland GmbH. According to the Albanian Government, six of the BO-105 helicopters are designated for the Albanian Air Brigade, four for the Ministry of Interior and the remaining two for the Albanian Ministry of Health.
	Agusta-Bell 205A	United States; Italy	Utility helicopter	3	3 UH-1 received in 2004, with a further 4 ordered for delivery through 2006. And 7 second-hand Agusta Bell-205A1 were donated by Italy in 2005.
	Agusta-Bell 206C	United States; Canada; Italy	Utility helicopter	3	
	Sikorsky UH-60 Black Hawk	United States	Utility helicopter	2 (4 more on order)	In April 2019, the Minister of Defense Olta Xhaçka, stated that Albania is in talks for the acquisition of Black Hawk helicopters. In 2021, in an interview with EuroNews, US Lieutenant colonel Erol Munir stated that the number of BlackHawks will be two and they are expected to enter the service during 2023. Two Black Hawks were delivered to Albania in January 2024.
	Aerial firefighting aircraft				
	Air Tractor AT-802	United States	Aerial firefighting aircraft	1 (2 more being delivered)	The Albanian Air Force received an Air Tractor AT-802 in 2026 for aerial firefighting and wildfire response missions. The aircraft was purchased by the Albanian Ministry of Defence.
	Unmanned aerial vehicles				
	RQ-20 Puma	United States	UAV	6	In July 2020, Albania expressed interest in buying 6 RQ-20B Puma Block AE. The training and preparation began in early September 2021 and the UAVs are since then used by the b2K.
	Magni X	Israel	micro-UAS	Unknown	
	Thor	Israel	UAS	Unknown	
	Unmanned combat aerial vehicles				
	Bayraktar TB2	Turkey	UCAV	9+ (more on order)	On 3 July 2021, Albania announced plans to acquire the Bayraktar TB2 UAV. Initially, the UAVs were only intended to be unarmed and to be used only for civil purposes such as monitoring the wildfire and the territory from Illegal constructions, as well as supporting SAR and police operations. In September 2022, during an interview, PM Edi Rama stated that 6 Bayraktar TB2 would be purchased and that, seeing the latest developments of the invasion of Ukraine, the drones would be equipped with weapons, so that in addition to the other previously stated purposes can also be used for military purposes. On 22 December 2022, Prime Minister Edi Rama announced Albania would be buying 3 new Bayraktar drones "the drones, which will be armed and ready for combat, will help authorities in a number of areas, including monitoring the Balkan country's territory, locating cannabis plantations and tracking wildfires" said Rama.
	Loitering munitions				
	Byker YIHA-III	Turkey Pakistan	Loitering munition	800 (First Batch) 2,400 more on order	On October 10, 2024, Albanian Prime Minister Edi Rama said that Turkey will donate "a significant number of kamikaze drones" to Albania, on the sidelines of a joint press conference with Turkish President Recep Tayyip Erdogan during his official visit to Tirana. Rama did not specify the number of drones, but emphasised that "no one should be concerned about who will strike Albania, but in the context of our relations, it is a gift from Turkey." Rama also said that the acquisition of an unspecified number of Turkish kamikaze drones does not mean "Albania will attack anyone." A spokesperson for the government contacted by Reuters was unable to provide any further details on the number or type of drones. In March 2025, the Albanian Minister of Defense posted a video on their YouTube channel where the AAF were operating the YIHA Kamikaze Drone from Turkey. The drone has a range of 60+ Km.

=== Air Armaments ===
Image	Name	Type	Origin	Notes
	Bombs			
	MAM	Laser-Guided Bomb	Turkey	All variants used. For Bayraktar TB2 Drones.
	Air-to-surface missiles			
	Roketsan Cirit	Air-to-surface missile	Turkey	For Bayraktar TB2 Drones.
	UMTAS	Air-to-surface missile	Turkey	For Bayraktar TB2 Drones.

=== Radars ===
Image	Model	Origin	Type	In service	Notes
	Radars				
	GM400α	France	Long-range surveillance	1	In the presence of the French Minister of the Armed Forces, Sébastien Lecornu, and Albanian Defence Minister Pirro Vengu, Thales was selected as strategic industrial partner to support a short-delivery-time request to supply a combat-proven Ground Master 400 Alpha (GM400α) air surveillance radar.
	AN/TPS-117	United States	Phased array Long-Range Radar System	2	As of November 2020, Albania Air Force operates a AN/TPS-117 Long-range radar system on Mida mountain near Pukë, which was a joint investment of Albania and the US through Lockheed Martin with $38 million coming from Albania and $3 million from the US. The radar is integrated into the NATO Integrated Air Defense System.
	GCS		Mobile Ground Control Station		Mobile UAV Ground Control Station.

== Structure ==
The air force's headquarters is located in Tirana and it operates three airbases: Tirana Air Base with the national Control and Reporting Centre, which reports to NATO's Integrated Air Defense System CAOC Torrejón in Spain, Kuçovë Air Base, and Lapraka Air Base, home to the government's transport helicopters.

- Headquarters - Tirana
  - Staff Support Company, in Tirana
  - Helicopter Squadron, at Farkë Air Base in Farkë
  - Support Squadron, at Kuçovë Air Base in Kuçovë
  - Unmanned Aircraft Detachment, at Kuçovë Air Base in Kuçovë with Bayraktar TB2
  - Ground-Based Air Defence Battalion
  - Air Surveillance Center, in Rinas reports to NATO Integrated Air Defense System's CAOC Torrejón at Torrejón Air Base in Spain
    - AN/TPS-77 radar on top of Mida mountain near Pukë
  - Military Meteorological Service, in Tirana
    - Automated weather stations in Farkë, Gjadër, Kuçovë, Kukës, Vlorë, and Gjirokastër

== Ranks ==
=== Officer ranks ===
NATO code	OF-10	OF-9	OF-8	OF-7	OF-6	OF-5	OF-4	OF-3	OF-2	OF-1
Albanian Air Force
Albanian Air Force			Gjeneral lejtant	Gjeneral major	Gjeneral brigade	Kolonel	Nënkolonel	Major	Kapiten	Toger	Nëntoger

=== Other ranks ===
NATO code	OR-9	OR-8	OR-7	OR-6	OR-5	OR-4	OR-3	OR-2	OR-1
Albanian Air Force
Albanian Air Force	Kryekapter	Kapter	Rreshter	Tetar	Nëntetar	Ushtar IV	Ushtar III	Ushtar II	Ushtar I

=== Roundels ===
Roundels of Albanian Air Force (1946–1992)

(1946–1958)

(1958–1960)

(1960–1992)

(1960–1992)

Fin flash (1946–1960)

== See also ==
- List of Albanian Air Force aircraft
- Albanian Armed Forces
- Albanian Land Force
- Albanian Naval Force
