= Kuçovë Aerodrome =

Air base in Albania

NATO Air Base Kuçova
- Kuçovë, Berat in Albania

Site information
- Type: Military airbase
- Owner: Albanian Ministry of Defence
- Operator: NATO, Albanian Air Force
- Controlled by: Albanian Air Force, NATO
- Condition: Operational

Location
- Coordinates: 40°46′19.0″N 19°54′6.8″E

Site history
- Built: 1952
- In use: 1955– present
- Events: Albanian Unrest of 1997

Airfield information
- Identifiers: ICAO: LAKV
- Elevation: 41 meters (135 ft) AMSL
Runways
Direction	Length and surface
14/32	2,853 meters (9,360 ft) Asphalt
09/27	2,500 meters (8,200 ft) Asphalt

Kuçovë Air Base (ICAO: LAKV) is an air base located near Kuçovë, Berat, Albania. The base was built in 1952 by People's Socialist Republic of Albania and entered service in 1955. NATO and Albania government renovated the Air Base in 2024 in the context of the ongoing NATO expansion into Eastern Europe.

== History ==
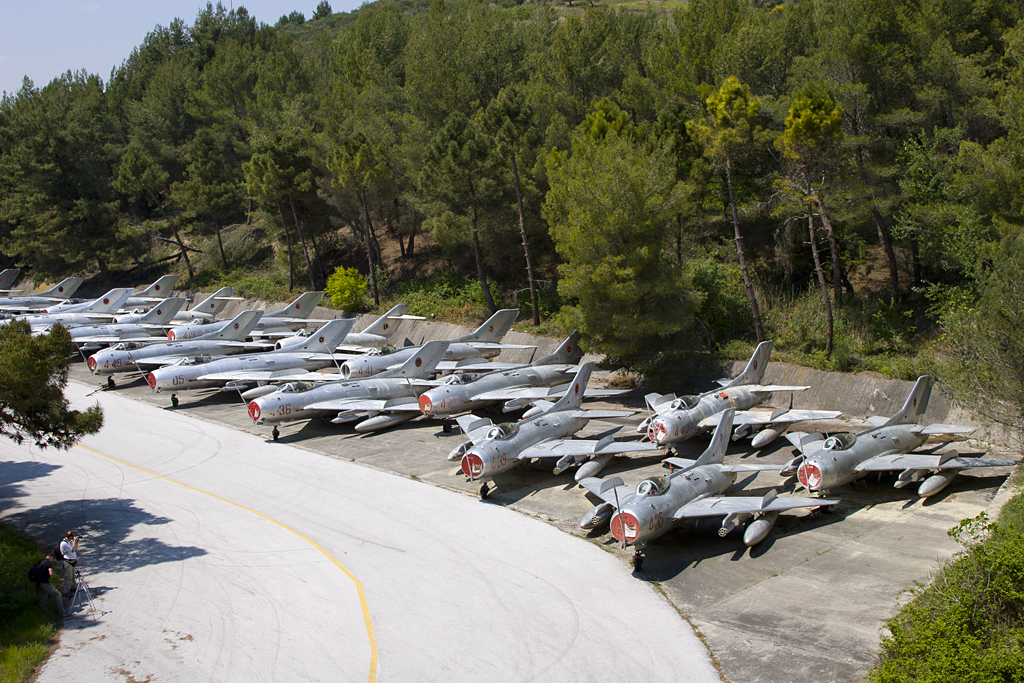
Albanian Air Force Shenyang F-6 fighters outside Kuçovë Air Base's tunnel.

Construction of the air base began in 1952 and was completed in 1955.

During the 1997 crisis, Kuçovë Air Base was captured by rebels. The damage caused by the protesters was not repaired until 1999.

From 2002 to 2004 the base was renovated to NATO standards. Improvements included a new control tower, new lighting, and repaving.

In 2004, Albania announced plans to scrap 80 obsolete aircraft in an effort to modernize for NATO membership. The aircraft being scrapped included MiG-15s, MiG-19s, and Yakovlev trainers as well as Chinese-made (Shenyang Aircraft Corporation) F-5s and F-6s. The aircraft were stored in Kuçovë during this process. Recently, many of these retired craft have been auctioned by the government of Albania.

In 2011, the base served as a filming location for the third episode of Top Gear's sixteenth series. The episode was seen as offensive to many due to derogatory comments made about Albanians by the cast.

In August 2018, the Prime Minister of Albania, Edi Rama, announced via Facebook that NATO would be investing in the base, saying "NATO will invest more than 50 million euros ($58 million) for the first phase of the project alone, to modernise air base in Kuçova."

One feature of Kuçovë Air Base is the underground hangar, accessed by a separate taxiway among the farm fields, about 1 km east of the main taxiway, dispersal, and runway complex.

On 4 March 2024 the renovated Air Base was inaugurated.

== Use after 2021 renovation ==
In 2021, the investments for the revitalization of the installations of the Kuçova base were planned to be carried out. "Already today we are at the end of the implementation of 3 important projects such as the fencing and security system, as well as the perimeter protection of the base. Approximately 50 million euros have been invested by NATO and more than 5 million euros have been invested by the Albanian government", explains the Commander of the Air Force.

Brigadier General Ferdinand Dimo explains the functions that will be performed by this base: "We are at the end of all the works for the Air Force troops to train at this base. But not only that, NATO troops and NATO aircraft can be accommodated, trained and flown from the Kuçova air base, which is already a NATO tactical air base."

NATO's tactical base in Kuçovë will also serve positively in the economic development of the entire district of Berat. "The construction of the NATO air base in Kuçovë has an extraordinary development impact in the community and in the entire area of the Berat district" according to Brigadier General Ferdinand Dimo.

After renovation, since March 2024 the air base has hosted NATO Balkan air policing, NATO flight operations and Albanian Air Force operations.

== See also ==
- List of airports in Albania
