= Lapraka Airfield =

Airfield in Tirana, Albania

Coordinates: 41°19′57″N 19°47′33″E

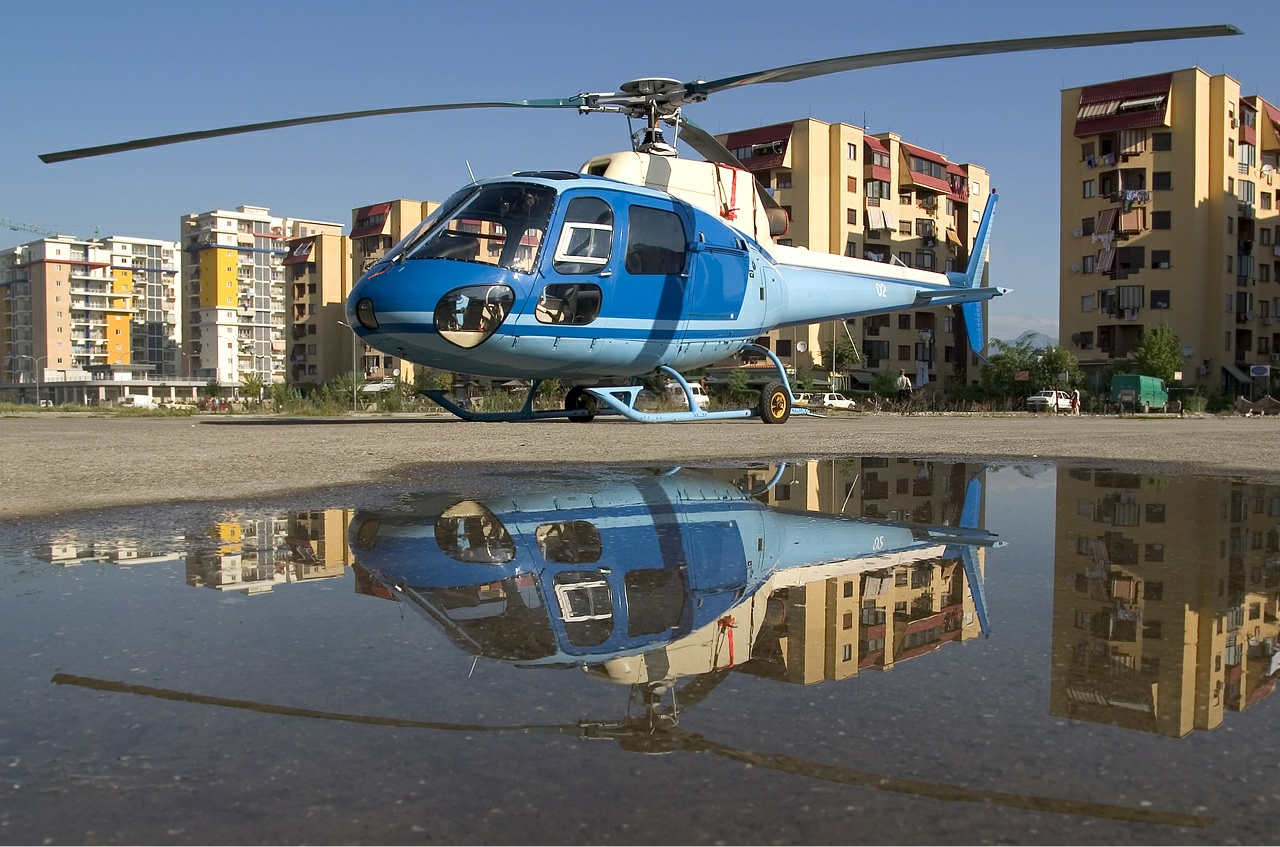
Aerospatiale AS-350B of the Albanian Air Force on the Lapraka Airfield

The Lapraka Airfield or Tirana Aerodrome (IATA: ZOOH) was an airfield located in Tirana, Albania. It is the former airport of Albania's capital. It used to house an air force regiment with Y-5 biplanes, operating from the old runway, and later, from the grass runway. Currently, Lapraka only houses the helicopters of the Albanian government. The airfield is located in the north western part of Tirana.
