= Shenyang J-5 =

Chinese version of the Soviet MiG-17

J-5
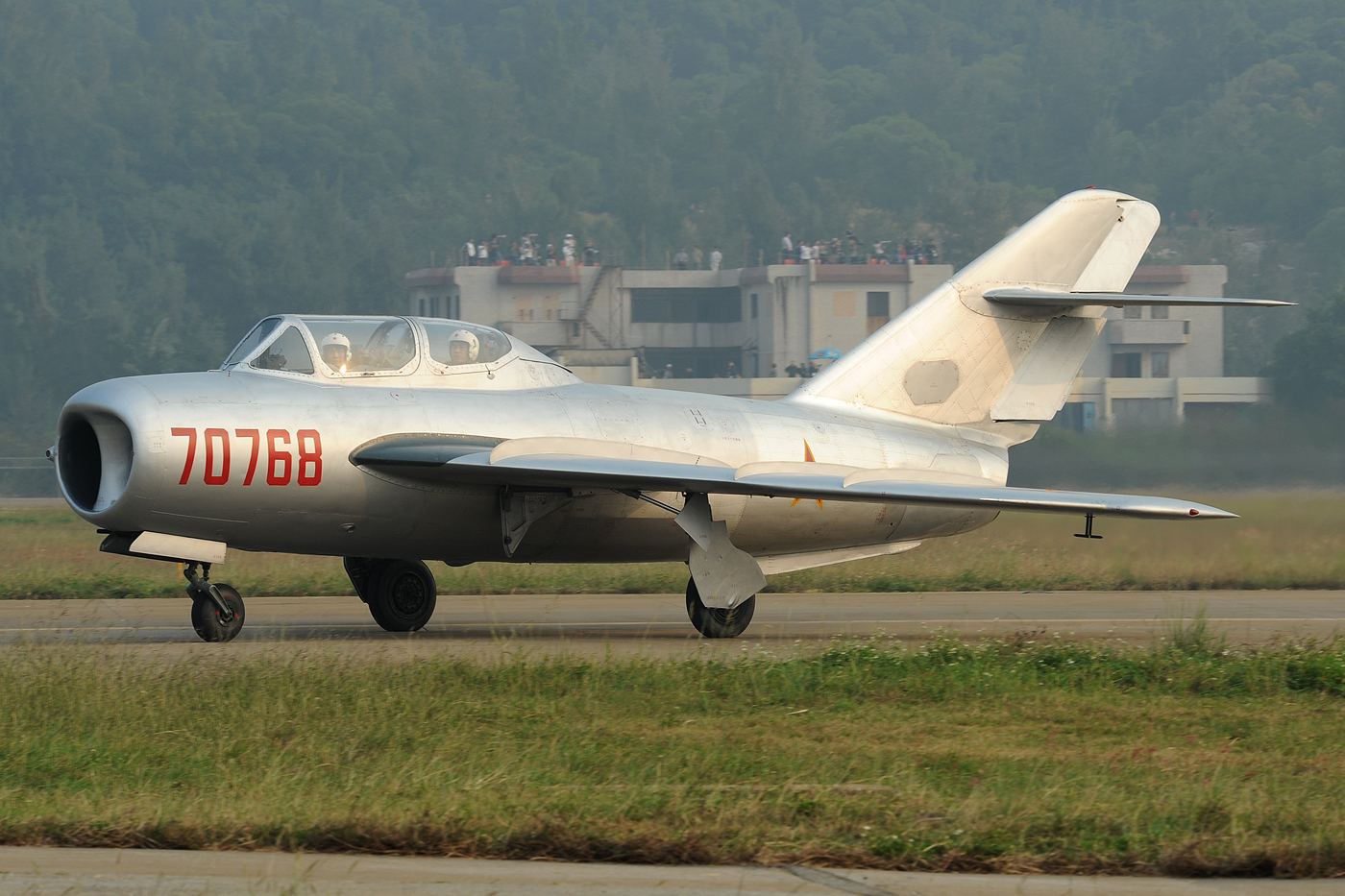
- Shenyang JJ-5, trainer variant of the J-5

General information
- Type: Fighter aircraft
- National origin: People's Republic of China
- Manufacturer: Shenyang Aircraft Corporation
- Status: In service with North Korea
- Primary users: People's Liberation Army Air Force (historical) Korean People's Army Air Force; Pakistan Air Force (historical); Vietnam People's Air Force (historical)
- Number built: 1,820+

History
- Manufactured: 1956–1969
- Introduction date: 1957
- First flight: 19 July 1956
- Retired: 1992 (China)
- Developed from: Mikoyan-Gurevich MiG-17

The Shenyang J-5 (Chinese: 歼-5) (NATO reporting name Fresco) is a Chinese-built single-seat jet interceptor and fighter aircraft derived from the Soviet Mikoyan-Gurevich MiG-17. The J-5 was exported as the F-5 and was originally designated Dongfeng-101 (East Wind-101) and also Type 56 before being designated J-5 in 1964.

== Development ==
The MiG-17 was license-built in China and Poland into the 1960s. The People's Liberation Army Air Force (PLAAF) obtained a number of Soviet-built MiG-17 Fresco-A day fighters, designated J-4 in the early 1950s. To introduce modern production methods to Chinese industry the PLAAF obtained plans for the MiG-17F Fresco-C day fighter in 1955, along with two completed pattern aircraft, 15 knockdown kits, and parts for ten aircraft. The first Chinese-built MiG-17F, (serialed Zhong 0101), produced by the Shenyang factory, performed its initial flight on 19 July 1956 with test pilot Wu Keming at the controls.

Plans were obtained in 1961 for the MiG-17PF interceptor and production began, as the J-5A (F-5A), shortly afterwards. At this time the Sino-Soviet split occurred, causing much disruption to industrial and technical projects, so the first J-5A did not fly until 1964, when the type was already obsolete. A total of 767 J-5s and J-5As had been built when production ended in 1969.

The Chinese also built a two-seat trainer version of the MiG-17, designated the Chengdu JJ-5 (Jianjiji Jiaolianji - Fighter Trainer - FT-5), from 1968, by combining the two-seat cockpit of the MiG-15UTI, the VK-1A engine of the J-5, and the fuselage of the J-5A. All internal armament was deleted and a single Nudelman-Richter NR-23 23 mm cannon was carried in a ventral pack. Production of the JJ-5 reached 1,061 when it ceased in 1986, with the type exported to a number of countries.

== Operational history ==
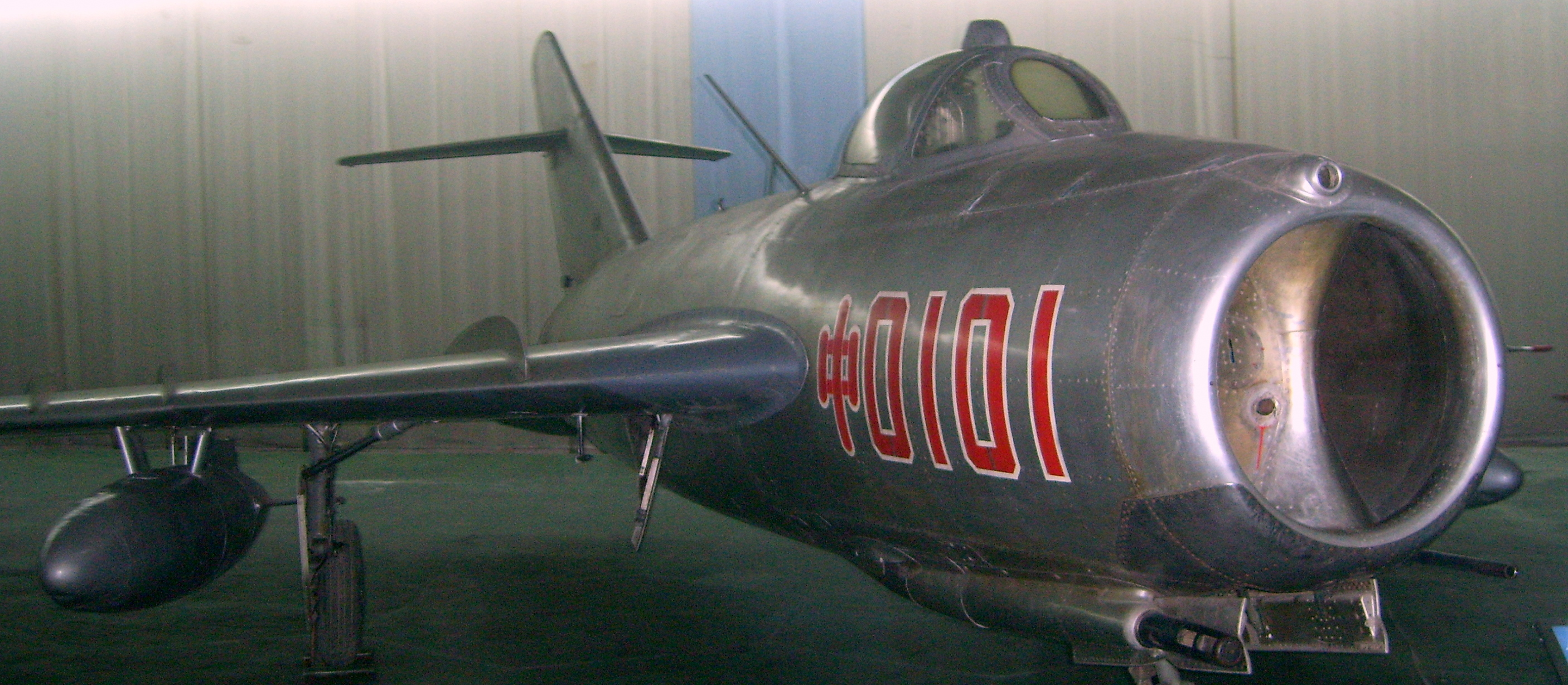
J-5 at the Beijing Aviation Museum

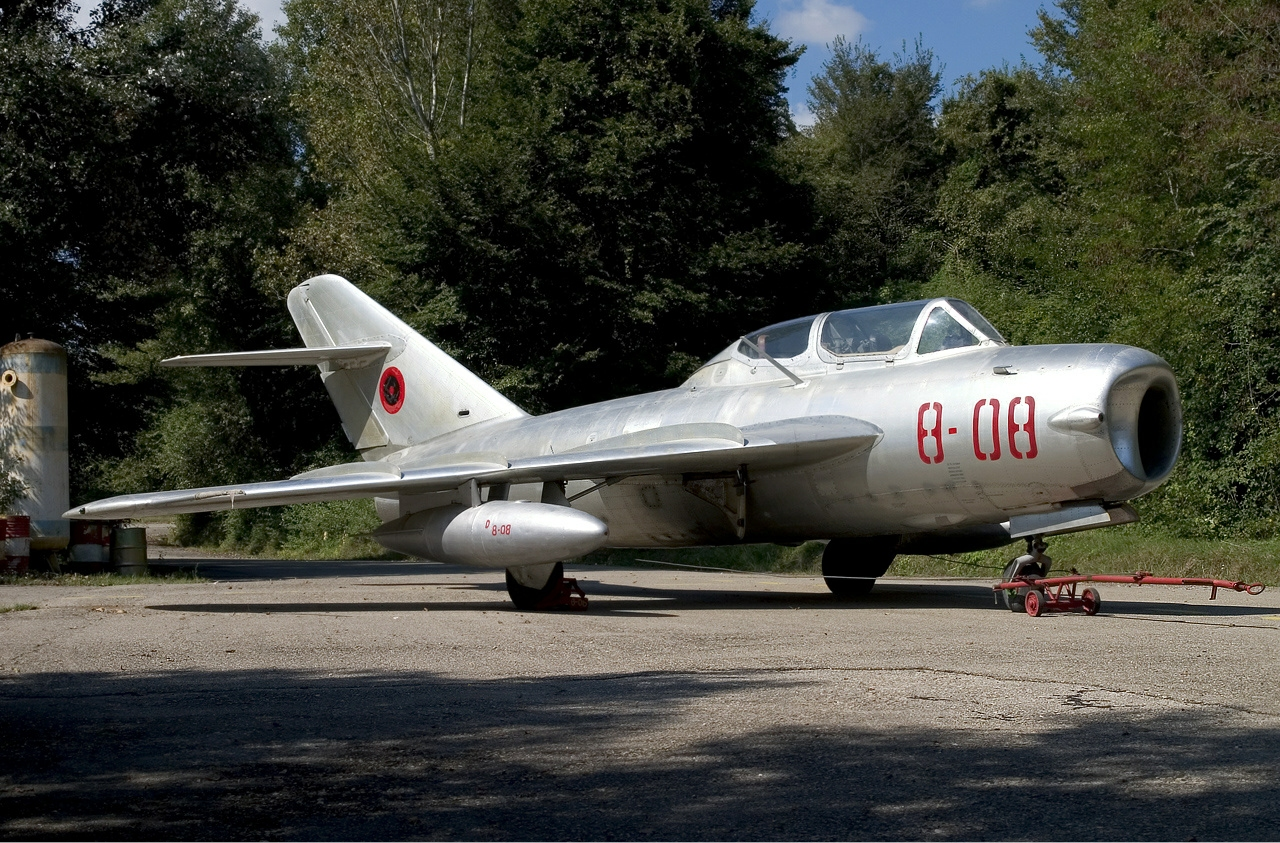
Albanian Air Force FT-5

The J-5 and JJ-5 saw widespread use by the PLAAF until supplanted by more capable aircraft such as the Shenyang J-6 and later Chengdu J-7.

== Variants ==
- Type 56 - pre-service designation for the J-5.
- Dongfeng-101 - original service name for the J-5.
- Shenyang J-5 - (Jianjiji-5 - fighter) Chinese production aircraft re-designated in 1964. 767 built, all single-seat variants.
- Shenyang J-5A - licence production of the radar-equipped Mig-17PF. The total production figure for this variant was over 300. J-5As were still in service with the PLAAF when J-6A & J-6B were phased out.
- Chengdu JJ-5 - (Jianjiji Jiaolianji - fighter trainer) A twin-seat trainer version of the J-5 designed and developed by Chengdu Aircraft Corporation. Combined the J-5 airframe, J-5A airbrakes and the tandem twin-seat cockpit section of the JJ-2 (MiG-15UTI).
- Shenyang J-5 torpedo bomber - A single aircraft modified to carry a single torpedo under the fuselage centreline. The central cannon was removed, as was some fuel storage capacity. Trials showed performance degradation was too great and further work was abandoned.
- F-5 - Export version of the J-5.
- FT-5 - Export version of the JJ-5.

== Surviving aircraft ==
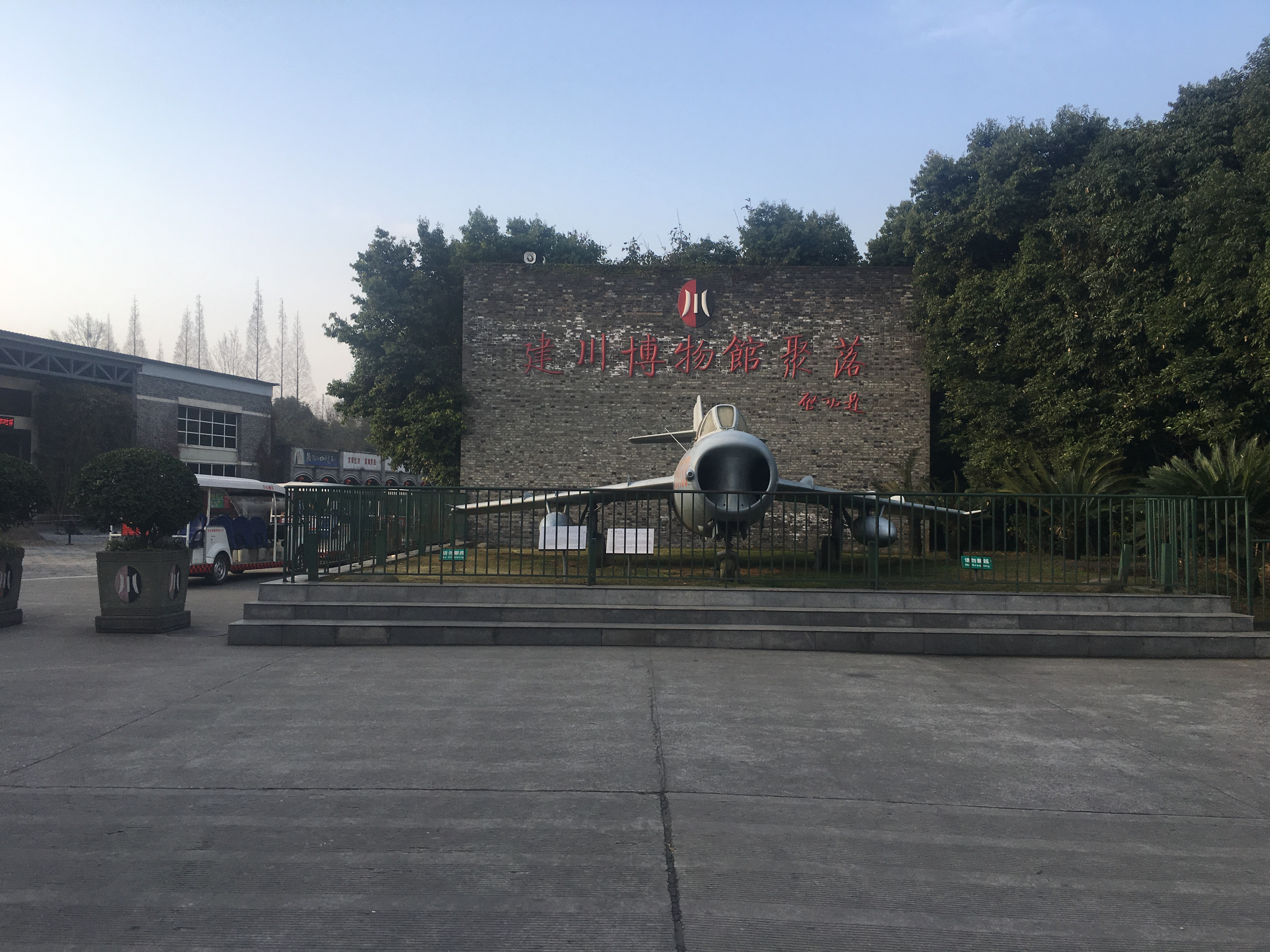
Chengdu JJ-5 at the Jianchuan Museum Cluster

The Jianchuan Museum Cluster has one JJ-5.

== Operators ==
=== Current operators ===
North Korea

- North Korean Air Force — 106 Shenyang F-5s and 135 Shenyang FT-5s are in service. However, reports of dire levels of serviceability suggest an airworthiness rate of less than 50%.

=== Former operators ===
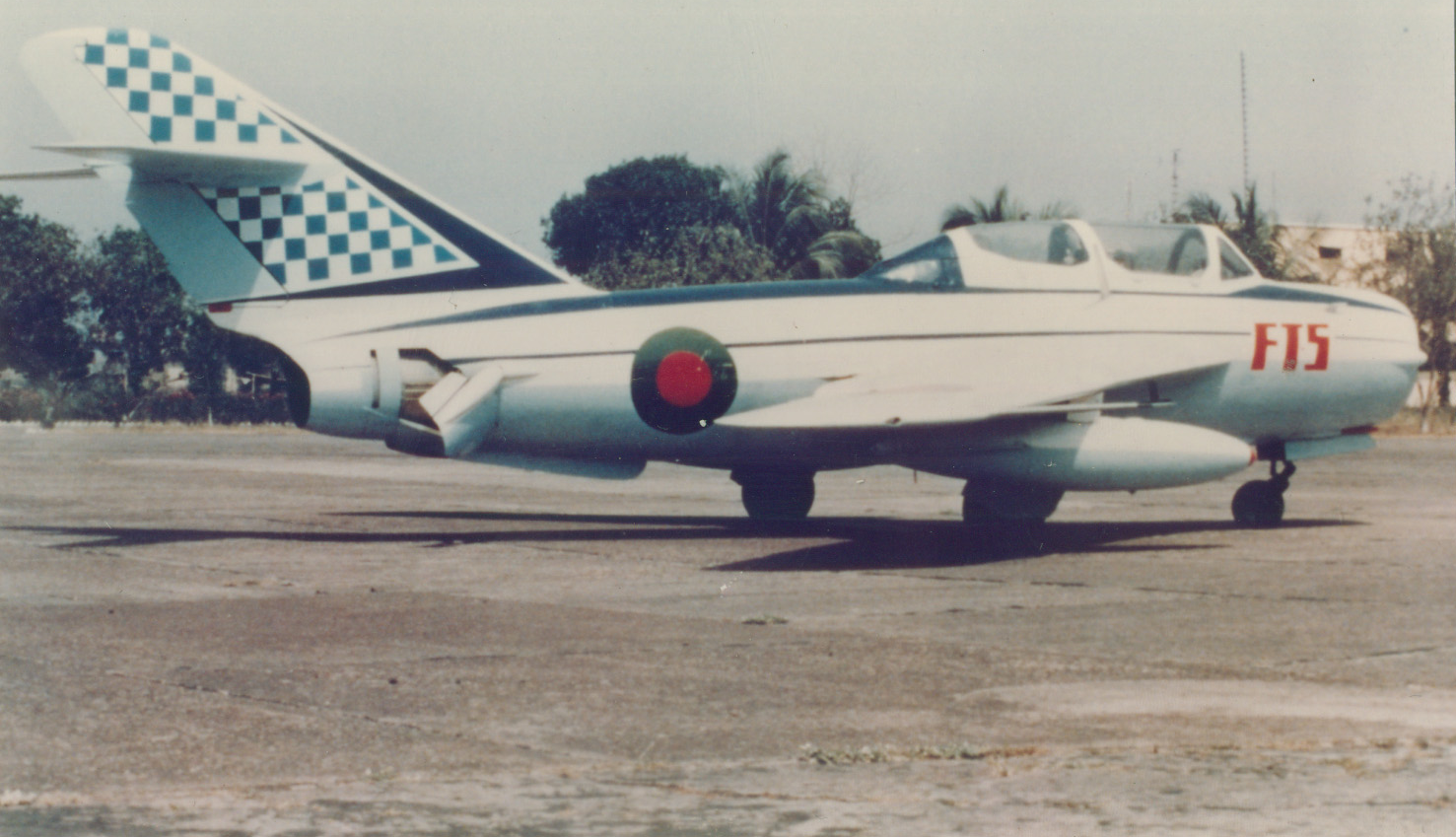
Bangladesh Air Force FT-5 trainer pictured in 1970s

Albania

- Albanian Air Force — Twelve F-5s and eight FT-5s were delivered, with an additional 58 F-5s subsequently acquired. Shenyang J-5 jets were among the first Chinese military aid to Albania. However, their deployment against the Yugoslav air incursions was relatively unsuccessful due to their subsonic speed, and the aircraft were soon reassigned once Shenyang J-6s became available. Remaining J-5s are retired and in storage. All J-5s have been retired from Albanian Air Force service.

Bangladesh

- Bangladeshi Air Force — All retired in 1980.

Cambodia

- Khmer Air Force — Ten Shenyang J-5 jets were delivered to the then Royal Khmer Aviation (AVRK) in 1965 as military aid. Only six were operational by 1970, only to be lost in January 1971 when the Cambodian Air Force was almost entirely destroyed on the ground by a North Vietnamese Army (NVA) Sapper attack.

China

- People's Liberation Army Air Force
- People's Liberation Army Naval Air Force

Indonesia

- Indonesian Air Force — 12 J-5s were delivered in 1959, retired in 1970.

Pakistan

- Pakistan Air Force — Retired 5 January 2012. The PAF's No. 1 Fighter Conversion Unit (FCU) operated more than 25 FT-5 trainers from 1975 to 2012, replaced in service by Pakistani-built K-8P Karakorums.

Sri Lanka

- Sri Lankan Air Force — J-5s were used as jet familiarisation trainers for Sri Lankan Air Force pilots.

Sudan

- Sudanese Air Force — 16 F-5s and FT-5s were delivered in 1969. Another FT-5 was received around 1983. Lastly, two FT-5s might have been ordered in 2001. Sudanese Air Force F-5s might have been used for ground attack missions against members of the Ansar movement in 1970.

Tanzania

- Tanzanian Air Force — Up to 22 FT-5 trainers delivered, starting in 1973.

Vietnam

- Vietnamese Air Force — The Vietnamese Air Force used J-5s alongside the Soviet-supplied MiG-17s for interception missions until the 1990s when they were retired, along with the remaining MiG-19s, being replaced with newer MiG-21s and Su-27s.

Zambia

- Zambia Air Force - 12 F-5s and FT-5s delivered, probably between 1976 and 1978.

Zimbabwe

- Air Force of Zimbabwe — Two FT-5s leased by China as trainers for Chengdu F-7s around 1986. They were later replaced by two twin-seat FT-7BZs, and returned to China by the mid-1990s.

== Specifications (J-5A) ==
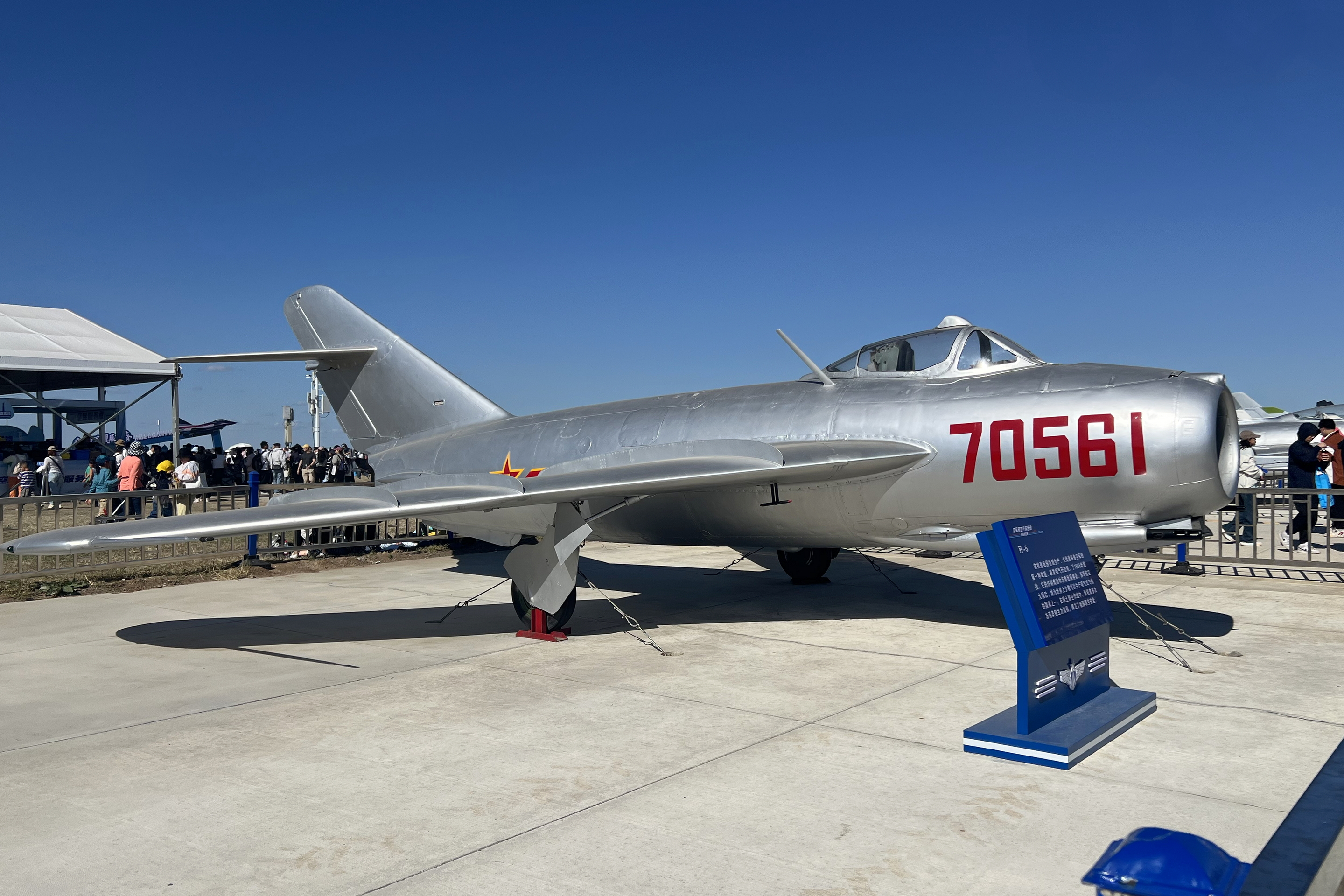
PLAAF J-5A

Data from Chinese aircraft : China's aviation industry since 1951

General characteristics

- Crew: 1
- Length: 11.09 m (36 ft 5 in) 11.36 m (37.3 ft)
- Wingspan: 9.628 m (31 ft 7 in)
- Height: 3.8 m (12 ft 6 in)
- Wing area: 22.6 m^{2} (243 sq ft)
- Empty weight: 3,939 kg (8,684 lb) 4,151 kg (9,151 lb)
- Gross weight: 6,000 kg (13,228 lb) 6,125 kg (13,503 lb)
- Powerplant: 1 × Wopen WP-5 turbojet engine, 25.5 kN (5,700 lbf) thrust 33.8 kN (7,600 lbf) with afterburning

Performance

- Maximum speed: 1,130 km/h (700 mph, 610 kn) at 5,000 m (16,000 ft): 1,145 km/h (711 mph; 618 kn)
- Range: 1,424 km (885 mi, 769 nmi) with drop tanks at 10,000 m (33,000 ft): 1,730 km (1,070 mi; 930 nmi)
- Service ceiling: 16,500 m (54,100 ft) 16,600 m (54,500 ft)
- Rate of climb: 65 m/s (12,800 ft/min) at 5,000 m (16,000 ft): 27 m/s (5,300 ft/min)

Armament

- Guns: 3 x Type 23-1 23 mm (0.906 in) aircraft cannon

== See also ==
Related development

- Mikoyan-Gurevich MiG-15
- Mikoyan-Gurevich MiG-17
- PZL-Mielec Lim-6

Aircraft of comparable role, configuration, and era

- Dassault Mystère IV
- Hawker Hunter
- CAC Sabre

Related lists

- List of military aircraft of the Soviet Union and the CIS
- List of fighter aircraft
