= List of Albanian flags =

The following is a list of flags used in Albania.

== Republic of Albania ==
=== State flag ===
Flag	Date	Use	Description
	2002	Flag of the Republic of Albania, community flag in Kosovo and North Macedonia	The national flag of Albania was standardized by Law Nr.8926, dated 22 July 2002 of the constitution and defined in articles II, III and IV. A physical description of the flag is summarized in Article III: § Article III – Shapes and dimensions of the national flag: 1. The national flag represents a blood red field, with a black double-headed eagle in the center, with open wings on the sides. Each of the eagle's wings has nine feathers, while the tail has seven feathers.; 2. The dimensions of the national flag have an aspect ratio of 1:1.4; 3. The appearance of the national flag, the strength of its colors and the ratios are those defined in appendix no.1, which is attached to this law and is an integral part of it.

=== Maritime flags ===
Flag	Date	Use	Description
		Civil ensign	A horizontal red-black-red triband
		Naval ensign	White background with a two-headed eagle and a red stripe along the bottom
		Government ensign	White background with a two-headed eagle and a blue stripe along the bottom
		Coast Guard ensign	White background with a two-headed eagle and a green stripe along the bottom

=== Government flags ===
Flag	Date	Use	Description
	2014–present	Presidential flag	The predominant colors are the colors of the national flag (red background and black eagle) and the golden color has been added which symbolizes strength, prosperity, and endurance. The decorative symbols of the flag are the black eagle taken from the coat of arms of the House of Kastrioti, accepting it as one of the most ancient symbols used by the Albanian leader; the (golden) Skanderbeg helmet positioned in a straight frontal stance, symbolizing impartiality and determination in representing national unity; as well as oak (golden) leaves which represent longevity, strength, and dignity, also taken as a symbol from antiquity used by King Gentius of the Illyrians. The use of the crown-shaped oak branches is also seen as a plinth which holds the other elements in place. Dimensions are specified as 140 cm x 100 cm.

==== Military flags ====
Flag	Date	Use	Description
	2011–present	Flag of the Albanian Armed Forces	The Armed Forces flag displays in the center a red shield, in which the helmet of Skanderbeg is placed.
	2011–present	Flag of the Albanian General Staff	The General Staff flag displays in the center a shield with the symbols of the Air Force, Land Force, and Naval Force stacked on top of each other.
	2011–present	Flag of the Albanian Air Force	The Air Force flag displays in the center a shield in light blue color, in which the wings are placed.
	2011–present	Flag of the Albanian Land Forces	The Land Force flag displays in the center a green shield, in which two crossed rifles are placed.
	2011–present	Flag of the Albanian Naval Force	The Naval Force flag displays in the center a shield in dark blue color, in which an anchor is placed.
	2011–present	Flag of the Albanian Training and Doctrine Command	The Training and Doctrine Command flag displays in the center an olive-colored shield which consists of a compass, a quill resting on a rolled up parchment, and an olive branch.
	2011–present	Flag of the Albanian Support Command	The Logistics Brigade flag displays in the center an olive-colored shield which consists of a rotary wheel, two crossed skeleton keys, and an olive branch.
	2011–present	Flag of the Albanian Military Police	The Military Police flag displays in the center a shield in dark blue color, in which there are two crossed swords with the letters "MP" over them.
	2011–present	Flag of the Tirana Military Hospital	The Military Hospital flag displays in the center an olive-colored shield, in which there is a white cross with a red outline, a snake, and a sword.
	2011–present	Flag of the Albanian Regional Support Brigade	The Regional Support Brigade flag displays in the center an olive-colored shield which consists of two venetian towers connected by a bridge with a white flame rising from the top and an olive branch.
	2011–present	Flag of the Albanian Military Intelligence	The Military Intelligence flag displays in the center an olive-colored shield, in which there is a stylized map, a key, and a sword.

==== Police flags ====
Flag	Date	Use	Description
	2016	Flag of the Albanian State Police	The Regulation of the State Police in Chapter II, Article IX, describes the flag of the State Police as a distinctive flag, a symbol of honor, bravery, glory, sacrifices in the name of law, and the spiritual unity of Albanian Police employees of all generations. The flag is handed over to the Director of Police by the Minister of Internal Affairs, on the occasion of his or her appointment. It is then placed on a cylindrical pole, with a pointed finial, silver in color, which is displayed in the office of the Director of the State Police and in the offices of the heads of the local police directorates.
	2021	Flag of the Republican Guard	The flag appears in a red color background, surrounded by a golden decorative cord, in the center of which is the eagle, used by the Guard since its establishment in 1928. The black double-headed eagle is outlined by a thin yellow thread, which makes it stand out inside the red background and rests on a golden floral decoration, often used in Albanian state emblems. Above the eagle is placed the stylized helmet of the Albanian national hero, Skanderbeg, in gold. Right beneath it is printed in capital letters GARDA E REPUBLIKËS.

== Historical flags ==
=== State flags ===
Flag	Date	Use	Description
	1878	Flag of the Bajrak of Kashnjeti	Ded Kol Bajraktari, the chieftain of the Bajrak of Kashnjeti (Dibrri) had unfurled this flag, on 10 June 1878, at the event known as the Albanian League of Prizren, swearing in the name of his bajrak, to preserve it with honor and glory. The flag with the inscription "Mirdita", is considered an object of great historical importance and a symbol of resistance for the people of the Mirdita region and areas of Northern Albania. The flag's dimensions are 95 cm x 75 cm. A field of blood-red cloth is made of a two-piece loom, of cotton thread. In the middle of the flag is the black double-headed eagle, above it is a silver shining sun and below the eagle is embroidered with Latin letters the name "MIRDITA". It is the only surviving flag of the twelve bajraks of Mirditë.
	1912–1914	Flag of the Provisional Government	The weekly Albanian language newspaper Zër' i Popullit (Albanian: The People's Voice), based in New York City, published on the cover page of its 7th issue, dated 17 December 1912, a color illustration of the Albanian flag. It shows a striking resemblance to a similar illustration found on the cover page of the 16th issue of the 2nd annual edition of Perlindja e Shqipëniës newspaper, the official publication of the newly formed Albanian State, dated 7 March 1914. Later evidence of the consistently unchanged design of the double-headed eagle is substantiated by newspaper Dielli in its 21st annual edition published on November 29, 1929, and titled: 1467===FLAMURI YNE===1912; with the descriptive subtitle: Sign of love for the Fatherland and the Symbol of Freedom.
	1913–1914	Flag of the self-proclaimed Republic of Central Albania	In the archives of the German Ministry of Foreign Affairs (Fund Section R–130365), scholar Marenglen Kasmi encountered a paper envelope which contained a letter signed by Essad Pasha Toptani and addressed by the Austro-Hungarian royal imperial embassy in Berlin to the German Ministry of Foreign Affairs, dated 7 May 1915. In it, a piece of cloth roughly 20 by 30 cm in length, in light red color with a white star polygon at the lower right corner is presented as the "national flag" with Essad Pasha identifying himself as interim president and general supreme commander. What stands out about this flag is its resemblance to the Ottoman flag, where only the crescent has been removed.
	1915	Flag of the Principality of Albania	The nearly square flag measures 156x140 cm in size. Its fabric is a thin, woolen cloth, dyed in red. Around the entire surface, on both sides, a double-headed black eagle is spray stamped. There are changes made to the wings, claws, and especially to the two heads, which appear too small in relation to the size of the eagle. On the chest, a golden shield with a blue peacock can be seen in what is a grafting of Albanian symbols with those of Wied's family. A 2012 auction in Genoa, Italy unveiled for the first time the flag of the principality, physically intact, displayed inside a square laminated wooden frame, with the descriptive title shown at the bottom in golden letters, embossed onto a black coated strip. The flag was found in Durrës on 20 December 1915 and had been taken from there by Italian diplomat Baron Carlo Aliotti aboard the Austrian destroyer SMS Lika. The flag variant widely in use today bears a resemblance to the graphic illustration found on the hardcover of the book from Spiridon Gopcevic, titled "Das Fürstentum Albanien", 359 pages, published in Berlin (1914) by Hermann Paetel Verlag.
	1916–1920	Flag of the Autonomous Province of Korçë	The protocol agreement on the Autonomous Province of Korçë states in Article IX, dated 10 December 1916: Le drapeau du Kaza de Korytza sera l’étendard traditionnel de Scanderbeg avec cravate tricolore aux couleurs françaises. The Kaza of Korça flag will be the traditional standard of Skanderbeg with the tricolor tie in the French colors. Restored flags of this period are currently housed at the Flag Museum in Korçë.
	1920	Flag used at the Congress of Lushnjë	The flag used at the Congress of Lushnjë was identified for the first time on 25 November 2011 inside the archives of the Ethnographic Fund at the Center for Albanological Studies. The flag is made of dark red silk or taffeta (xanthocellulose artificial silk) and has in its center a black two-headed eagle, stylized in the shape of the same eagle used by the provisional government, since a national flag had not yet been formalized. On one side of the flag there are three metal rings, which serve to tie the flag to the handle. Its dimensions are 121 cm by 70 cm.
	1920–1926	Flag of the Albanian Republic	Around 1920, the Albanian flag was, and continues to be, a red field with a black, double-headed eagle in the center. This design, representing the national hero Gjergj Kastrioti Skanderbeg, was officially raised on November 28, 1912, to mark independence and remained the emblem of the young, newly independent state during the post-WWI era.
	1921	Flag used by the High Council of Regency	Illustration of a large flag displayed hanging on the wall background inside the High Council of Regency building with members Aqif Pasha Elbasani and Luigj Bumçi sitting opposite of each other. A similar flag was used during this time period at the demilitarized border area known as the Neutral Zone of Junik.
	1926–1928	Flag of the Albanian Republic	The flag of Albania used from 1926 to 1928, during the Albanian Republic (1925–1928), featured the traditional red field with a black double-headed eagle in the center. It closely resembled the national emblem, representing sovereignty during the leadership of Ahmet Zogu, prior to the declaration of the Kingdom in 1928.
	1928–1939	Flag of the Albanian Kingdom	Article III of the Fundamental Statute of the Albanian Kingdom describes the flag as red with a black two-headed eagle in the center. A variant of this flag is on display at the Mezuraj Museum. The square-shaped flag, currently in the possession of the Royal Family, was produced in the latter period of King Zog's reign and can be seen in archived film footage being replaced by fascist officers during the unveiling ceremony of the new fascist flag, on 4 December 1939. The royal flag was widely used by government institutions, the army and embassies abroad.
	1939–1943	Flag of the Kingdom of Albania	The Yearbook of the Kingdom of Albania in its 1940–XVIII edition, describes in Title I, Article II of the Constitutional Charter the following: The Albanian flag is red, charged at the center with the black double-headed eagle and the sign of the lictor fasces. The description of the flag is further specified in the official journal of the Albanian government, in its 18th annual edition, dated 25 November 1939, issue nr.116, page.3, which reads: The National Flag of the Kingdom of Albania is formed by a cloth in a rectangular shape, high in two thirds of its length, red in color, charged in the center with a red shield (scudo) with the black two-headed eagle crowned by the helm of Skanderbeg, in black color. Bearings: Two black Lictor fasces, supported with axes on the outside, adjoined with one another at the top by the Savoy knots in black, and below by a black stripe in the form of a scroll ribbon, charged with the word "Fert", repeated three times in red color. The State Flag will be used in the residences of the Sovereign dignitaries and members of the Royal Family, in the Headquarters of the Upper Fascist Corporate Council and in the Government Offices, with the coat of arms headed by the Royal Crown of Savoy. Images of the flag used during this time are available at the Istituto Luce archive. The flag is displayed at different public events, from the inauguration of a local school by prime minister Shefqet Vërlaci, to the opening session of the Albanian Fascist Party congress which was held at the Palace of the Superior Fascist Corporative Council.
	1943–1944	Flag used during the German occupation of Albania	On September 8, 1943, the union with the Kingdom of Italy was officially dissolved and the country reverted to the decrees of September 1928. Improvised vertical flags, which differed in shape and contortion, were used during this period, notably at the funeral procession of regent Fuad Dibra on February 23, 1944, and during the oath ceremony of government military formations.
	1944–1946	Flag of the Democratic Government of Albania	The flag used by the Democratic Government of Albania, which was the first ruling government following the war of liberation, was published for the first time in the War Bulletin of National Liberation (Albanian: Buletin i Luftës Nacional-Çlirimtare), issue nr.51 dated 28 November 1944. The usage of this specific flag is widely seen in public events and military court proceedings as well as in the opening session of the Constitutional Assembly on January 10, 1946. It has also been confirmed in the 1980 publication by the Marxist–Leninist Studies Institute titled "Epopeja e Luftës Antifashiste Nacionalçlirimtare e Popullit Shqiptar 1939–1944".
	1946–1992	Flag of the People's Socialist Republic of Albania	Law nr.5506, dated 28 December 1976 of the constitution of the People's Socialist Republic of Albania in Chapter III, Article I, Title CVIII describes the flag as follows: § Article CVIII – Flag; The state flag of the People's Socialist Republic of Albania represents a red field with a black double-headed eagle in the center, on top of which is a red star with five corners, embroidered all around in gold. The ratio between the width and the length of the flag is 1:1–40.
	1992–2002	Flag of Albania	A red rectangular field, with a black, double-headed eagle positioned in the center.

=== Political parties' flags ===
Flag	Date	Use	Description
	1977	Flag of the Democratic Front of Albania	The flag of the Democratic Front of Albania was stamped in certificates and presented with badges awarded by the district leadership to the "Activist of the Democratic Front of Albania" with the motivation: Distinguished in socio-political activities for propagandizing the directives and decisions of the Labour Party of Albania to the wider masses of the Front members and putting them into practice. The flag illustration is an evolution of the original model which first appeared in membership quota passes issued as early as 1965.
	1978	Flag of the Party of Labour of Albania	A hand holding the flag of the Party of Labour of Albania, with the stylized likenesses of Marx, Engels, Lenin and Stalin depicted in profile. The flag which was used at the 8th party congress, is described as follows: «THE VICTORIOUS FLAG OF THE PARTY, THE FLAG OF MARXISM-LENINISM, WILL ALWAYS WAVE PROUDLY IN THE NEW SOCIALIST ALBANIA»

=== Flags of the heads of state ===
Flag	Date	Use	Description
	1925–1928	Presidential flag	State symbols during the period of the First Republic were always shown in square form. This was preponderant with the national flag, state emblem, presidential insignia and even symbols used in commerce. The flag of the president of the republic is seen for the first time in Teki Selenica's encyclopedic guide book Shqipria më 1927, e illustruar, page 124.
	1929–1939	Flag of his Royal Highness and of the Army	
	1946–1992	Flag of the President of Albania	Square version of national flag.
	1992–2002	Flag of the President of Albania	Square version of national flag.
	2002–2014	Flag of the President of Albania	Square version of national flag.

=== Military flags ===
Flag	Date	Use	Description
	1916	Flag of the 6th Detached Regiment	The flag used by the 6th detached regiment (c.1916) during World War I is made of a red woolen cloth, with a black eagle in the center. Below the eagle is the number 6. Three sides of the flag are outlined by a row of triangles. On the left side is the place where the spear or the rope is inserted. This part of the flag is made of cotton fabric, gray to blue in color. Its dimensions are 120 cm by 85 cm.
	1917	Flag of the Albanian Militia Units	Flag of the Albanian militia units assigned to the Italian army during World War I. This specimen dating from 1917 was placed at the unit headquarters.
Clockwise from top left: Battalion flags of Erzen, Shkumbin, Vjosa and the Kosova Gendarmerie.	1927–1928	Flags of the Battalions of the First Republic	The first military battalions during the period of the Republic were inaugurated in the spring of 1927. In accordance with the military tradition of the time, they were given the names of rivers such as Erzen, Shkumbin, Vjosa, etc. The flags awarded to these battalions were made of a high quality silk material. The fiery red fabric gleams from within, extending across the surface. On each side is embroidered in black the stylized double-headed eagle. The embroidery was done conjointly, passing the black thread from one side to the other, which made the flag stronger. On one side, a lining is open for the pole to be inserted, while the other three sides are embroidered by a band of black triangles, which perhaps emulated fringes. Their dimensions are unequal, varying in length from 120 cm to 130 cm, with the width ranging from 96 cm to 98 cm. There were no set rules applied during this time period in standardizing the size of the flags. Each flag is accompanied by a dual stripe ribbon, in black and red, measuring 220 cm to 230 cm in length and 8 cm in width. The bottom of the ribbon is decorated with tassels, made of brass threads, imitating gold. On the red part, is inscribed in large yellow letters, of cotton thread, the word BATALIONI and on the black part, the name of the respective battalion. In one of the ribbons, the name of the battalion is absent, likely damaged from deterioration. It was later discovered that it belonged to the Vjosa battalion. The awarding flag ceremony took place on June 9, 1927.

=== Maritime flags ===
Flag	Date	Use	Description
	1453–1793	Civil ensign	Civil ensign used by mostly Albanian merchants in the Ottoman Empire. Similar to the modern civil ensign of Albania.
	1914–1925	Civil ensign of the Principality of Albania	Red-black-red triband with a white star in the center.
	1946	Flag of the National Combat Navy	The flag of the National Combat Navy (Albanian: Marina Luftarake Kombëtare) was approved by decree nr.193 of the People's Assembly, dated October 19, 1946. Similar in appearance to the merchant steamship flags of the early post independence period, it featured three horizontal stripes, red–black–red, fixed by a golden anchor with a red five-pointed star as the centerpiece.
	1945–1992	Civil ensign of the People's Socialist Republic of Albania	The Civil ensign flag used during the communist period, upholds the design principles of its predecessors. A conspicuous three stripe layer, red–black–red.
	1954–1958	Naval ensign of the People's Socialist Republic of Albania	A light blue background with the flag of Albania used at the time in the canton.
	1958–1992	Naval ensign of the People's Socialist Republic of Albania	White background with a two-headed eagle and a red star with a red stripe along the bottom.
	1958–1992	Government ensign of the People's Socialist Republic of Albania	White background with a two-headed eagle and a red star with a blue stripe along the bottom.
	1958–1992	Coast Guard ensign of the People's Socialist Republic of Albania	White background with a two-headed eagle and a red star with a green stripe along the bottom.

=== Medieval flags ===
Flag	Date	Use	Description
	c. 1444	Flag of Skanderbeg	Flag said to be used by Skanderbeg and the League of Lezhë based from his family Coat of Arms.
	1510	Flag of Mercurio Bua	The red insignia with the eagle and the Cross of Saint Andrew was a gift by his Majesty Emperor Maximilian I to Captain general Mercurio Bua of the Leggeri cavalry. Found in a manuscript written by Ioannes Coroneos, a contemporary of Bua, the flag features a crowned black double-headed eagle, symbol of the Byzantium, the Holy Roman Empire and of the Kastrioti, the Cross of Burgundy and the four "B"s or firesteels, used in the Paleologi arms but also linked to the House of Habsburg's Order of the Golden Fleece.
	1598	Flag of Skanderbeg by Hieronymus Henninges	A printed graphic illustration from the medieval period found in the major Latin work of German humanist-genealogist Hieronymus Henninges, published in Magdeburg in 1598 and titled "Theatrum Genealogicum ostentans omnens omnium aetatus familias…", shows the standing figure of Skanderbeg, with a sword in his belt and a flag on his right hand, depicting the image of the double-headed eagle, which in terms of its form, appears to be of the Middle European tradition.

=== Diaspora flags ===
Flag	Date	Use	Description
	1884	Flag of the Drita Society	Shoqëria Drita was a pan-Albanian organization which aimed to promote Albanian education and political activism. Based in Istanbul, the society had a separate branch in Bucharest, Romania. The flag used to identify the branch was submitted in 1946 to the archives of the Institute of Sciences by an anonymous source. The flag's dimensions are 158 cm by 117 cm. Yellow fringes hang on the sides. In the center, painted in a golden yellow brush is the following text: SOQÈRÍA E SQIPÈTAREVÈT “DRITA” PÈR MÈSIM NÈ SQIP FILUARÈ NÈ BUCUREȘT 1884 ȘÈ NDREUT 16 Decorations like the laurels, the crescent with the eight-pointed star and the one-headed eagle are also painted in golden yellow. Noticeable to the naked eye is that above the eight-pointed star is drawn with a carbon pencil an orthodox cross-shaped symbol, which is an overlap from a later period. The crescent was likely used as a symbol of the Ottoman Empire, of which Albania was still a part of. In explaining the spelling changes in Latin, the Romanian letter "ș" is used, which is pronounced as "sh" in Albanian.
	1904	Flag of the Dëshira Society	In the beginning of the 20th century, the Albanian community in Sofia, then Principality of Bulgaria, commissioned the design and creation of a national flag to represent the recently formed Dëshira Society. The flag's dimensions are 110 cm by 100 cm. With holes on the left side where the stick pole is inserted, it has a field divided into two equal parts, one red and the other white (in concept) but actually having more of a cream or beige hue. The idea was perhaps borrowed from the design of the Bulgarian flag. In the center lays skillfully stitched a large black eagle, unlike today's official eagle found in the national flag. At the time, the design of the double-headed eagle did not have a unified standard which led to the creation of different variants. Under the eagle is written in gold, bright metallic thread the following: СOQERIA E CQIПETAREVET “DECIRE” FlɅUAR ME 1 KOɅOZEG 1893 NE SOFJE. On the sides hang yellow, heavy fringes, which, like the letters and the two upper tassels, are considered golden. The darkening that the letters have undergone over the years may indicate a metal of low quality. The flag stays taut in any hanging position and weighs 1.5 kg. Its unveiling took place on August 28, 1904.
	1918	Flag of the National Band "Vatra"	The flag was donated by the Drenova Society "Bashkimi" in 1918. On April 2, 1920, the society's musical band arrived in Albania with a group of volunteers at the request of prime minister Sulejman Delvina and participated in the events for the liberation of the country. The flag dangled on a wooden rod, preceding the band's marches. Produced in 1918, the symbolic flag is of average dimensions, 101 by 66 cm. On the red background of the silk fabric is printed the following: BANDA KOMBETARE VATRA DHURATE NGA SHOQERIA DRENOVARE BASHKIMI 1918 A real lace material made of yellow metallic yarn that mimics gold, surrounds the entire flag. The small, round temples sparkle in the lace mesh, giving it an appealing look. On the bottom, hang long, spiral fringes of metal thread. In between, a lyre that shines like gold is made of yellow foil, while the metal thread is in copper, the surface of which is enriched with zinc, giving the brass a golden appearance. For centuries, pure gold was no longer used in embroidery, not even in royal clothing.
	1919	Flag of the Djelmoshe Society	Shoqërija Djelmoshe (Albanian: Youth Society), as its name was written in the society's official statute but commonly referred to as Shoqnia Djelmënia was an Albanian organization that promoted education in the mother tongue to the Albanian community living in Istanbul, Turkey, mainly in and around the areas of Topkapı, Eyüp, and Üsküdar. The flag used by the society is 156 cm long and 90 cm wide. Two very high quality silk fabrics are sewn on top of each other. Small red and black tassels hang on the edges, four of which located in all corners are larger in size. In the center is painted with tempera a dark gray patterned eagle and below it the following text: RROFT SHQIPNIA; GUSHT 1919 The eagle is different from that of the official flag since at the time there were no laws to define the shape of the national symbols. We notice that in this flag there is no place to insert a spear, nor a rope. Was it meant to be hung on a wall or perhaps used as a banner of manifestation? The flag is currently preserved at the ethnographic fund of the Institute of Cultural Anthropology and Art Studies and owing to laboratory interventions once made, it is in good condition although the tempera paint with which the eagle and the writing are made has long since cracked and splintered.
	1944–1991	Flag of Albania without the red star	During the socialist period, the most common diaspora flag was the one without the red star, which in this case symbolizes communism, and so looks the same as the contemporary official flag.
		Flag of the Arbëreshë people	Flag used by both the Arbëreshë people, an Albanian ethnic group in Southern Italy, and the comune of Piana degli Albanesi.

=== Personalized flags ===
==== Postcard flags ====
Flag	Date	Use	Description
	1902	Flag of Aladro Kastriota	A document from the Ottoman archives of 1902, explains how Juan Pedro Aladro Kastriota, a Spanish citizen who claimed descent from Skanderbeg, a famous 15th century Albanian nobleman that rebelled against the Ottomans and became an obstacle to their early expansion — thus making him a pretender to the Albanian throne — distributed postcards throughout several European capitals, namely Paris, Rome, Athens and Saint Petersburg, featuring a photograph of himself next to a variant illustration of the Albanian flag. In excerpts published by the French literary journal "L'Écho des Jeunes" from its 238th issue, dated 1 October 1903, a brief profile of Don Juan de Aladro Kastrioti is given which includes a speech he had made on 31 January 1902 and addressed to the Albanian people that mentions the following: "The glorious name of Skanderbeg is our banner. With that cry on my lips, in the shade, with this flag, let us all unite..." The double-headed eagle in Aladro's flag is later seen in a publication of the nationally syndicated Minerva Magazine, Issue 004–005, Page 26, Year 1932.
	1920	Flag of Spiridon Ilo	The flag model that is sometimes thought of as the most proximate in likeness to the one raised in Vlorë on Independence Day, is based on the illustration found in a 1920 postcard, produced by Spiridon Ilo. Titled "Flamuri Kombëtar", the flag has the following description: Remembrance for the day of freedom when the Flag was raised in Vlorë 28 November 1912

==== Trivial flags ====
Flag	Date	Use	Description
	1929	Flag of the Albanian National-Balkanian Party	Albanian researcher, scholar, orientalist and founding member of the Pan-European Committee in Albania, Osman Myderrizi, proposed the idea of a future national flag within the flag of a new Balkan Confederation. Inspired by political events which coincided with the pacifist movement in Europe at the time, the flag was particularly noted for its circle of stars symbol, present today in the official flag of the European Union. Both flags attached to the same pole were described in unison: Under the shadow of this flag, a symbol of brotherhood and unity, the peoples of the Balkans will find freedom, happiness and honor. The future flag of Albania in the framework of the Balkan Confederation – Paris 1929
	2014	Autochthonous Flag	On October 14, 2014, at approximately 21:27 local time, the Serbia–Albania football match that was played for the qualifying round of the UEFA Euro 2016 tournament, was interrupted. At that moment, above the night sky of Belgrade, a waving flag hanging from a drone slowly approached the playing field. The flag in a black background, showed a map covered by a variation of the Albanian national flag, encompassing territories beyond Albania's present borders, alongside the portraits of Ismail Qemali and Isa Boletini with the inscription “AUTOCHTHONOUS”. The map resembles to some degree Nikolla Lako's 1913 ethnographic map of Albania, obtained by the American Geographical Society in 1921. Similar maps validating the historical ethnographic reach of the Albanian speaking population had been confirmed by prior authors such as Lejean (1861), Mirkovich (1867), Kiepert (1876), Sax (1877) and Markezinis (1905).
	2016	Flag of the self-proclaimed Republic of Chameria	Author and poet Atdhe Geci, nominated by the so-called all-inclusive assembly of Chams and Arvanites, declared Chameria a Republic on October 30, 2016. Festim Lato, the main organizer and financier of the event, was to serve in his capacity as Prime Minister. The flag design is modelled on the national flag and features a blue crowned coat of arms with a molossian hound in a jumping posture.
	2018	Flag of Çerçiz Topulli	The flag raised during the UEFA Nations League football match between Albania and Scotland, held on November 17, 2018, shows the figurehead of Çerçiz Topulli, an Albanian guerrilla leader, wearing a traditional brimless hat with scruffy hair and a beard. The image, although unrelated, is surprisingly similar to that of Che Guevara, which makes it even more interesting when one considers the jointly inscribed first two letters of the name Çerçiz spelled "Çe", are pronounced exactly like the Spanish equivalent "Che".

== Albanian flags used in Kosovo ==
Flag	Date	Use	Description
	1910	Flag of Isa Boletini	The flag of Isa Boletini was used for the first time at the Assembly of Isniq in 1910. It was later raised on top of a hill in Visekovc and on 12 August 1912, Boletini with thirty of his men, carried it through the streets of Skopje, which at the time was part of the Vilayet of Kosovo. The same flag was used in Vlorë, when Boletini and a cavalry of four hundred fighters entered the city on the day Albania declared its independence. The flag is made of red silk, edged with golden fringes and has in the center a black double-headed vulture with the heads of a serpent looking down. Awarded the Hero of the People title, Boletini was a prominent figure in the movement for an independent Albania. He is featured in a painting by Nikolet Vasia which inspired the famous scene in the 1982 film Nëntori i Dytë, where Boletini is seen kneeling down and kissing the Albanian flag while Ismail Qemali and other participants look on.
	1918	Flag of the Committee for the National Defence of Kosovo	The committee for the "National Defence of Kosovo" was established in Shkodër on 1 May 1918. Its main goal was an independent Albania that was excluded from any kind of protectorate and the inclusion of Kosovo within its borders. The top symbol of the flag used by the committee, a pentas flower shaped star, can be seen in a 1916 photograph of a banner hanging at a children's school in Gjakovë which indicates that it was a commonly used symbol in this region.
	1986	Flag of the Albanian Nationality in Yugoslavia	After extensive discussions by the state authorities concerning the regulation for the usage of the flags of ethnic minorities in Yugoslavia, it was determined that Albanian nationals can use the flag of the Albanian nationality but only in harmony and by explicitly manifesting "the state and territorial sovereignty and their integration within Yugoslavia". The flag of the Albanian nationality is defined by this ethnic group as its own symbol which expresses the feelings of national consciousness. An illustration of the flag was published by newspaper "Zëri" on November 8, 1986.
	1992	Flag of Dardania	The Flag of the Presidency of Kosovo, commonly known as the "Flag of Dardania", was ideated by Ibrahim Rugova in 1992, then the political leader of the Autonomous Province of Kosovo, who sought recognition of Independence following the dissolution of Yugoslavia. The flag, measuring 1 x 1.5 m in length, is presented in a deep blue color background which symbolizes peace. In the center, is displayed a circular seal consisting of the double-headed black eagle, the national symbol of the Albanian population of Kosovo. The red background within the seal, outlined by a golden stripe, exemplifies power. The shield itself epitomizes the royal character of Kosovo. Two six-pointed stars which are placed on the golden backgrounds symbolize the movement of the sun and life and are thought to be of medieval Albanian origin. The red and black fields represent the colors of the national flag. The white banner hovering in front of the shield illustrates the white color of the plis and that of traditional clothing. The banner reads DARDANIA, the ancient name of Kosovo. The golden hexagram above the eagle is borrowed from the flag of Skanderbeg. Today, the flag is officially used by the President of Kosovo.
	1998	Flag of the Kosovo Liberation Army	The emblem in the flag of the Kosovo Liberation Army was created by Adnan Asllani, a graphic artist, activist and member of the People's Movement of Kosovo (LPK), from the village of Strezoc, present day Presevo. The emblem was conceived in late December 1997 and in the following weeks it began mass production at a textile factory in Switzerland where the first specimens were printed. The red represents the color of blood and that of the national flag. The yellow, which radiates like gold, symbolizes the sun and light, whereby the KLA soldiers would bring to the lands they fought to defend. The emblem was subsequently adapted as a symbol during the conflicts in Presevo and Macedonia.

== See also ==
- Flag of Albania
- Coat of arms of Albania (armorial)
- Albanian heraldry
- List of flags of Kosovo
