= Xhemal Gjunkshi =

Albanian military officer

Xhemal Gjunkshi MP
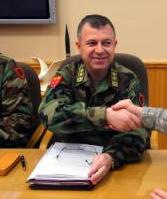

Member of the Albanian Parliament for Dibër
- In office September 9, 2017 – February 18, 2019
- Prime Minister: Edi Rama

Chief of General Staff of the Albanian Armed Forces
- In office August 8, 2011 – September 7, 2013
- President: Bamir Topi; Bujar Nishani
- Prime Minister: Sali Berisha
- Preceded by: Maksim Malaj
- Succeeded by: Jeronim Bazo

Personal details
- Born: 30 January 1963 (age 63) Peshkopi, Dibër
- Party: Democratic
- Education: Albanian Military Academy
- Occupation: Military officer Deputy

Military service
- Allegiance: PSR Albania; Albania
- Branch/service: Albanian General Staff
- Rank: Major General
- Commands: Commando Regiment; Support Command; Logistics Brigade

Xhemal Gjunkshi (born 30 January 1963) is a former Albanian military officer. Since 2017 he started his career as politician and began Member of Parliament (MP) for Dibër. From August 2011 to November 2013, he served as Chief of General Staff of the Albanian Armed Forces. He was elected as deputy of Democratic Party in June 2017 general election.

== Early life ==
Gjunkshi was born in Peshkopi, Dibër, People's Republic of Albania on 30 January 1963. He began his military studies at the “Skenderbej” Military High School in 1978, two years after the transition of Albania from the "People's Republic" to the "People's Socialist Republic." Gjunkshi graduated from the school in 1985.

== Military career ==
Gjunkshi began his military career commanding at a platoon and later company level. Gjunkshi was promoted to captain in 1992 and major in 1993. He was later appointed battalion commander in Peshkopi. In 1998, Gjunkshi graduated from a military academy in Turkey.

From 1998 to 2004, Gjunkshi served in multiple varying roles in the General Staff and the Ministry of Defence. In 1999, he was promoted to lieutenant colonel. From 2004 to 2007, he served as Albania's military attaché to Turkey. In 2005, he was promoted to colonel. In 2007, Gjunkshi was appointed commander of the Commando Regiment, an elite unit of the Albanian Armed Forces.

In October 2008, a group of soldiers in the Commando Regiment sent a letter to the government of Albania and the United States Embassy in Tirana reporting corruption within the regiment. The letter alleged that Gjunkshi demanded bribes in exchange for assignments to serve in the International Security Assistance Force or Multi-National Force – Iraq. The alleged bribe values equalled half of the additional pay soldiers would receive as part of their assignments.

In 2009, Gjunkshi was appointed commander of the Support Command and later promoted to brigadier general. In December 2009, commander of the Logistic Brigade.

On 8 August 2011, by decree of President Bamir Topi, Gjunkshi was appointed Chief of the Albanian General Staff. On 10 November 2011, Gjunkshi was promoted to major general by Presidential Decree No. 7156.

On 7 November 2013, Gjunkshi was released from his position by Presidential Decree No. 8370.

== Personal life ==
During his career, Gjunkshi has received numerous awards and decorations. In 2008, Gjunkshi was named an “Ambassador for Peace” by the Universal Peace Federation. In November 2012, Gjunkshi was awarded the International Prize for Peace“Bonifacio VIII” by the Academy Bonificiana, in the town of Anagni, Italy.

He is married and has a son and a daughter.

== Timeline of Ranks ==
Insignia	Rank	Date
	Captain	1992
	Major	1993
	Lieutenant Colonel	1999
	Colonel	2005
	Brigadier General	2009
	Major General	10 November 2011

== See also ==
- Albanian Army
