= Luan Hoxha =

Albanian military officer, 8th Chief of the General Staff of the Albanian Armed Forces

Lieutenant General Luan Hoxha (born 28 March 1960 in Shkodër, Albania) was the Chief of General Staff of the Armed Forces of Albania until 16 June 2008. He became Chief of General Staff of Albanian Armed Forces in 2006 after serving as the Deputy Chief of General Staff of the Albanian Armed Forces for three years, beginning in 2003. He was dismissed by the Albanian President Bamir Topi after Prime Minister Sali Berisha proposal.

== Early life ==
He was born on 28 March 1960 in Shkodër, Albania. He entered the Mehmet Shehu Military Academy in 1980. He graduated in 1983.

== Military career ==
Upon commissioning into the Albanian People's Army, Hoxha served as a platoon leader from 1983–1985 and the commanding officer of a company from 1985–1987. He then took on roles as a military engineer, first for a brigade in 1987, and that same year, he became a battalion commander, serving until 1991. He then was assigned to the Spiro Moisiu Defense Academy (now the Armed Forces Academy) for two years from 1991-1993, after which he joined the Ministry of Defence of Albania as director of the engineering directorate.

He was then made Commander of the Land Forces Academy in 1993, and after earning a degree at the Defence College in Tirana in 1995, he assumed command of the Skanderbeg Military Academy. After his term ended in 1997, he completed the European Training Course at the Geneva Centre for Security Policy (1997), at the George C. Marshall European Center for Security Studies, the Royal Military College of Science (2000–2001) and the NATO Defense College (2002). He also undertook training at the Operational Leadership Course in Norfolk, Virginia. During this period, was also director of human resources, director of external relations, director of defense policy and integration of the Ministry of Defence from 2000-2003.

He became Deputy Chief of General Staff in 2003. In 2006, he completed a Defense Management Course in the United States and earned a master's degree in defence diplomacy from the Royal Military College of Science in the United Kingdom.

== Dismissal as Chief of the General Staff ==
On 15 March 2008, a series of catastrophic explosions at an ammunition-decommissioning facility in the village of Gërdec, killed 26 people, injured at least 264 others. Albanian Defence Minister Fatmir Mediu resigned two days after the explosion and Hoxha was dismissed by President Bamir Topi on 16 June 2008 after Prime Minister Sali Berisha's proposal as a result of the explosions.

In 2012, an Albanian court convicted and jailed 19 people over the explosion, including Hoxha, who got a six year sentence. A year later, it was reduced to five years. To avoid the punishment, he has since moved to the United States.

== Personal life ==
He is married and has two children. Besides his native language, he is fluent in English and Russian.

== Awards ==
- Military Service III Class Medal
- National Service Medal
- Recognition Medal
- Medal for Exceptional Service in the General Staff of the Albanian Armed Forces
- Career Medal

== See also ==
- Chief of the General Staff (Albania)
- Albanian Support Command
