= Albanian Joint Forces Command =

Albanian Joint Forces Command Komanda e Forcës së Bashkuar
- Coat of Arms of the Albanian Joint Forces Command
- Active: December 2006 - April 2010
- Country: Albania
- Allegiance: Albanian Armed Forces
- Branch: Land Forces; Air Force; Naval Defense Forces
- Type: Unified Combatant Command
- Size: 30,000
- Headquarters: Tirana
- Website: http://www.gs.mil.al

Commanders
- General: Maksim Malaj

The Albanian Joint Forces Command, consists in the branch of the Albanian Armed Forces charged with protecting the territorial integrity of Albania. The Command has under the proper structure the Rapid Reaction Brigade, the Special Operations Battalion, the Albanian Air Force, the Albanian Naval Defense Forces and the Area Support Brigade.

== History ==
Albania requested a Defense Assessment from the United States in coordination with NATO (Allied Command Transformation) and NATO Headquarter Tirana, early in 2006 in order to ensure that previous reform efforts were proceeding well and to provide for course corrections if needed. Conclusions of this work encouraged both Ministry of Defence and General Staff of AAF to continue refining force structure and reducing the size of the Armed Forces by reducing staffs and removing obsolete units making the resultant force more capable and affordable.

A major element of this restructure process was the development of a Joint Forces Command. This streamlined the command and the control of operational units, by contributing more effectively to NATO led Peace Support Operations.

Another key element of this restructuring was the consolidation of almost all units under three major commands; the Joint Forces Command, the Albanian Training and Doctrine Command, and the Albanian Logistic Support Command, thus enhancing supervision of subordinate units and reducing the span of control of the General Staff.

== Basic History ==
In 1999, (based on the old structure The Albanian Land Forces were the main Albanian Armed Forces battle component), the AAF were in alert due to a possible military confrontation with Yugoslavia over the contested territory of Kosovo. Previous preparations during the 90's, included the purchase of the Chinese antitank missile HJ-8, and the antiaircraft HN-5, an improved version of the Russian SA-7. During the 1998-1999 Kosovo War a vast part of the Albanian Armed Forces were deployed along the Albanian-Yugoslavian border.

== Developments ==
The Albanian Land Forces used to field more than 721 Type 59 Main Battle Tanks and 130 M113 Armoured Personnel Carriers. Most of the Cold War-era equipment from the Soviet Union and China has been retired or put in storage, some has been scrapped or sold off. With the new structure, the Albanian Armed Forces does not keep any main battle tanks on active duty although there are some in reserve. Anti-tank weaponry, also combined with Helicopter capability will be the priority. Albania is now a member of NATO and procedures for the acquisition of a new APC in order to achieve the standards required for troop training are underway to achieve the necessary compatibility with NATO equipment standards.

== Weapons ==
=== Small arms ===
- TT-33 Main service sidearm
- Makarov PM Used by Republican Guard
- Beretta 92 Used by special forces
- MP5 Used by special forces
- MP7 Used by special forces
- AK-47 service rifleMain
- AKM Main service rifle
- Type 56 Main service rifle
- HK G36 Used by special forces
- ARX-160 Used by Albanian troops in Afghanistan
- Heckler & Koch HK416 Evaluation only
- HK 417 Used as sniper by special forces
- Dragunov SVD Main service sniper
- RPK Main service LMG
- DShKM Being withdrawn from service
- DP-27 Being withdrawn from service
- PKM Moderately used
- KPVT Being withdrawn from service
- ZU-23-2 Main service AA gun
- HN-5 Being withdrawn from service
- RPG-7 Main service AT weapon
- HJ-8 Moderately used
- SG-43

=== Artillery ===
- Type 67 Main service mortar
- M-46 100 Type 59-1
- D-20 Chinese and Soviet manufactured
- D-1 Being withdrawn from service
- ML-20 Withdrawn from service
- M-30 Withdrawn from service
- D-44 Main service field gun

=== Vehicles ===
- BMP-1
- BMP-2
- BTR-50
- BTR-152
- BRDM-2
- Humvee
- Iveco VM 90
- T-55
- M113

== Manpower and equipment ==
As of 2005, the Land Forces Command had:

- 16,000 + active personnel and 35,000 reserves:.

On 2010 the Joint Forces Command authorized personnel strength will be approximately 8,200. (With the new structure, the 5 Reserve Brigades have been deactivated)

== Organization ==
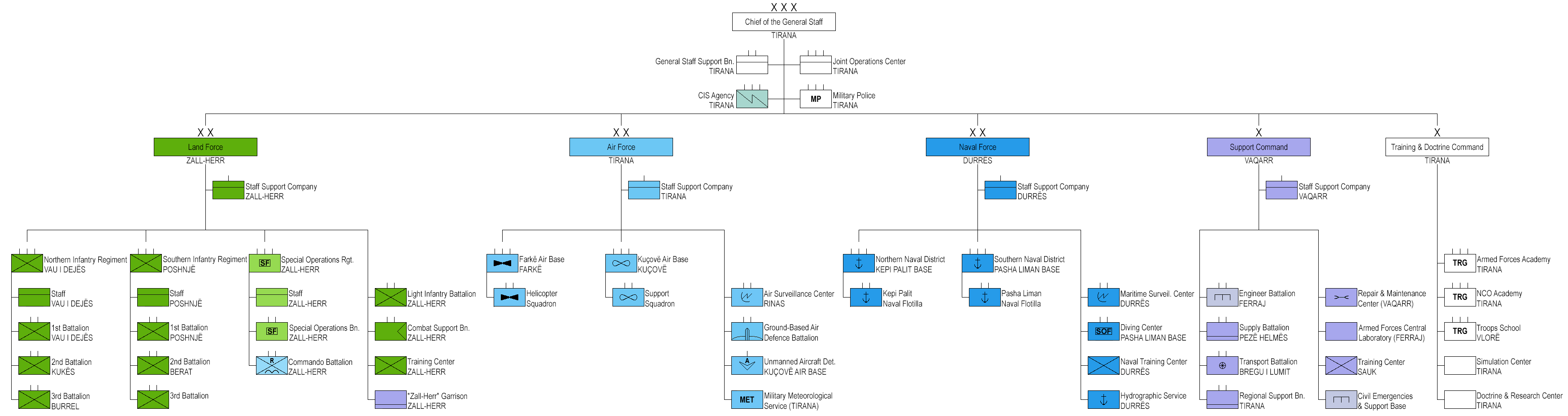
Albanian Armed Forces organization as of November 2025

== See also ==
- Military of Albania
- Albanian Air Force
- Albanian Naval Defense Forces
