= Manushaqe Shehu =

Albanian brigadier-general

Manushaqe Shehu is an Albanian brigadier-general who has since 2018 been the Deputy Chief of the General Staff of the Albanian Armed Forces.

== Career ==
Manushaqe Shehu joined the Albanian Land Force at the age of 19 in 1984. Her father, uncle and two brothers also served in the army. Shehu graduated from the Armed Forces Academy and was commissioned as an officer in 1984. She served as chief logistics officer of the Peshkopia Brigade.

Between 1989 and 1994 Shehu studied law at the University of Shkodër "Luigj Gurakuqi" and was promoted to first captain in 1991. She then worked with the United States Department of Defense and the World Bank. Shehu studied at a logistics school in France and at the Albanian Army General Staff College from 2004 to 2005. She was promoted to the rank of lieutenant-colonel in 2006 and served as security adviser to President Bamir Topi from 2007 to 2011. Shehu was awarded a master of science degree in national security in 2010 and was promoted to colonel. She was director of the Albanian general staff in 2012.

On 1 November 2016 Shehu was appointed commander of the army's non-commissioned officer academy and was promoted to the rank of brigadier-general. She was the first female general in Albania. Shehu was appointed head of the army's Training and Doctrine Command in December 2016. She is married with two children.
