= Bardhyl Kollçaku =

Albanian military officer

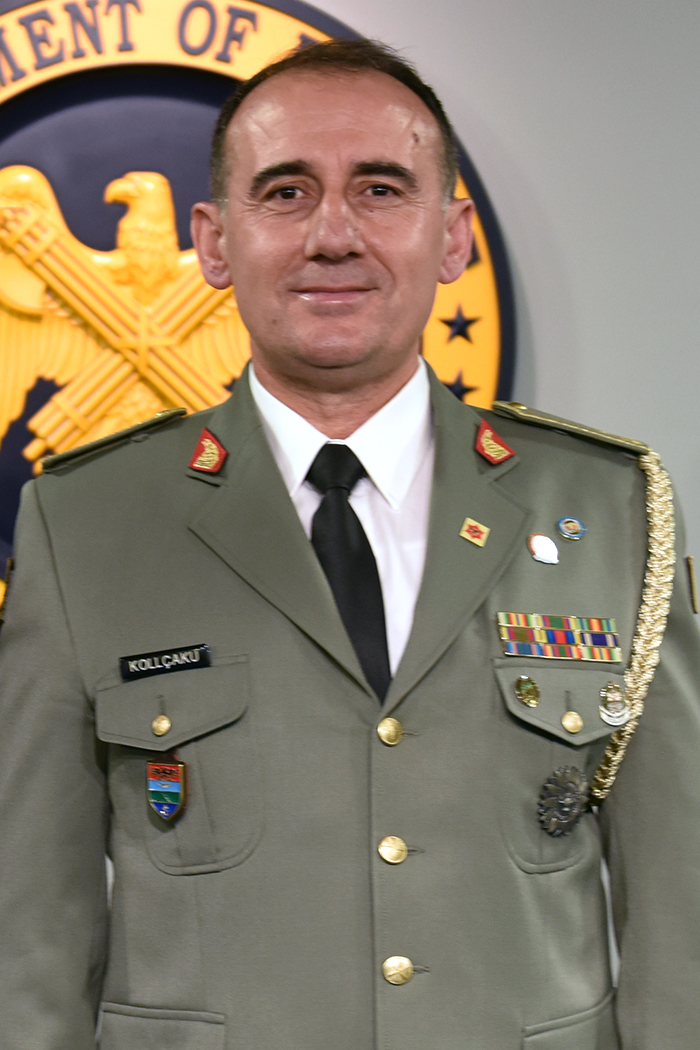
- Maj. Gen. Bardhyl Kollçaku in 2018

Chief of General Staff of Albanian Armed Forces
- In office 28 October 2017 – 29 July 2020
- President: Ilir Meta
- Minister of Defense: Olta Xhaçka
- Preceded by: Jeronim Bazo
- Succeeded by: Bajram Begaj

Personal details
- Born: 5 June 1967 (age 59) Berat, People's Socialist Republic of Albania
- Spouse: Valbona Kollçaku
- Children: 2
- Education: Albanian Military Academy “Skënderbej”
- Profession: Military officer

Military service
- Allegiance: PSR Albania (1985–1991); Republic of Albania (since 1991)
- Branch/service: Albanian People's Army (1985–1991); Albanian Armed Forces (1991–2020)
- Years of service: 1985–2020
- Rank: Brigadier General

Bardhyl Kollçaku is a former Albanian military officer, who served as the Chief of General Staff of the Albanian Armed Forces.

== Chief of General Staff ==
In 2017, Kollçaku was made the new Chief of General Staff of Albanian Armed Forces by Presidential Decree, issued by President Ilir Meta. He was succeeded in this role by Major General Bajram Begaj in 2020.

== Personal life ==
Kollçaku is married to Valbona Kollçaku and has two children, Argios and Kejsi.
