= United States Army War College =

Educational institution in Carlisle, Pennsylvania

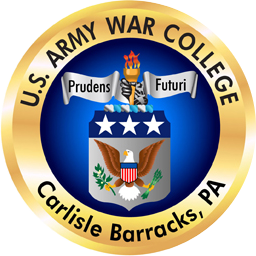
- Logo of the U.S. Army War College
- Motto: Prudens futuri
- Motto in English: Wisdom and strength for the future
- Type: War college
- Established: 1901; 125 years ago
- Affiliations: United States Army Combined Arms Command
- Officer in charge: MG Antwan Dunmyer
- Students: 800
- Location: (postal address); Carlisle, Pennsylvania, U.S. 40.211°N 77.173°W
- Website: www.armywarcollege.edu
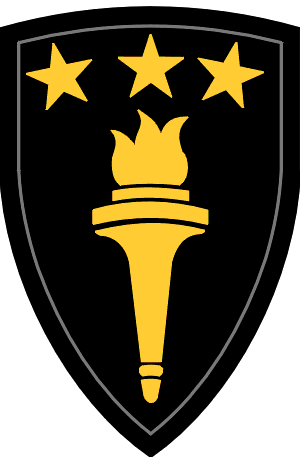

The United States Army War College (AWC) is a U.S. Army staff college in Carlisle Barracks, Pennsylvania, with a Carlisle postal address, on the 500-acre (2 km^{2}) campus of the historic Carlisle Barracks. It provides graduate-level instruction to senior military officers, government officials, and civilians to prepare them for senior leadership assignments and responsibilities. Each year, a number of Army colonels and lieutenant colonels are considered by a board for admission. Approximately 800 students attend at any one time, half in a two-year-long distance learning program, and the other half in an on-campus, full-time resident program lasting ten months. Upon completion, the college grants its graduates a master's degree in Strategic Studies (MSS).

The Army War College is a split-functional institution. Emphasis is placed on research and students are also instructed in leadership, strategy, and joint-service/international operations. It is one of the senior service colleges including the Naval War College and the USAF Air War College. Additionally, the U.S. Department of Defense operates the National War College.

On 2 October 2025, The United States Army War College (AWC), a direct reporting unit (DRU) to the Chief of Staff of the Army (CSA); together with its authorities, responsibilities, assigned subordinate elements, personnel, and resources (including funding and equipment); was redesignated and reassigned to the CG, Combined Arms Command (USACAC), subordinated unit of the United States Army Transformation and Training Command (T2COM).

== Mission ==
According to U.S. Army Regulation 10–87, the Army War College "educates and develops leaders for service at the strategic level while advancing knowledge in the global application of landpower."

== History ==
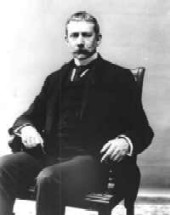
Elihu Root

Established from the principles learned in the Spanish–American War, the college was founded by Secretary of War Elihu Root and President Theodore Roosevelt, and formally established by General Order 155 on 27 November 1901. Washington Barracks, now called Fort Lesley J. McNair, in Washington, D.C. was chosen as the site. Roosevelt attended the Masonic laying of the cornerstone of Roosevelt Hall on 21 February 1903.

The first president of the Army War College was Major General Samuel B. M. Young in July 1902 and the first students attended the college in 1904.

During the presidency of Montgomery M. Macomb in 1916, President Woodrow Wilson accused students and staff of planning for taking part in an offensive war, even though the United States had not entered World War I. Wilson was unconvinced by Macomb's explanation that the college was concerned only with the intellectual growth and professional development of its students, and insisted that the school curtail its activities in order to ensure that the U.S. maintained its neutrality.

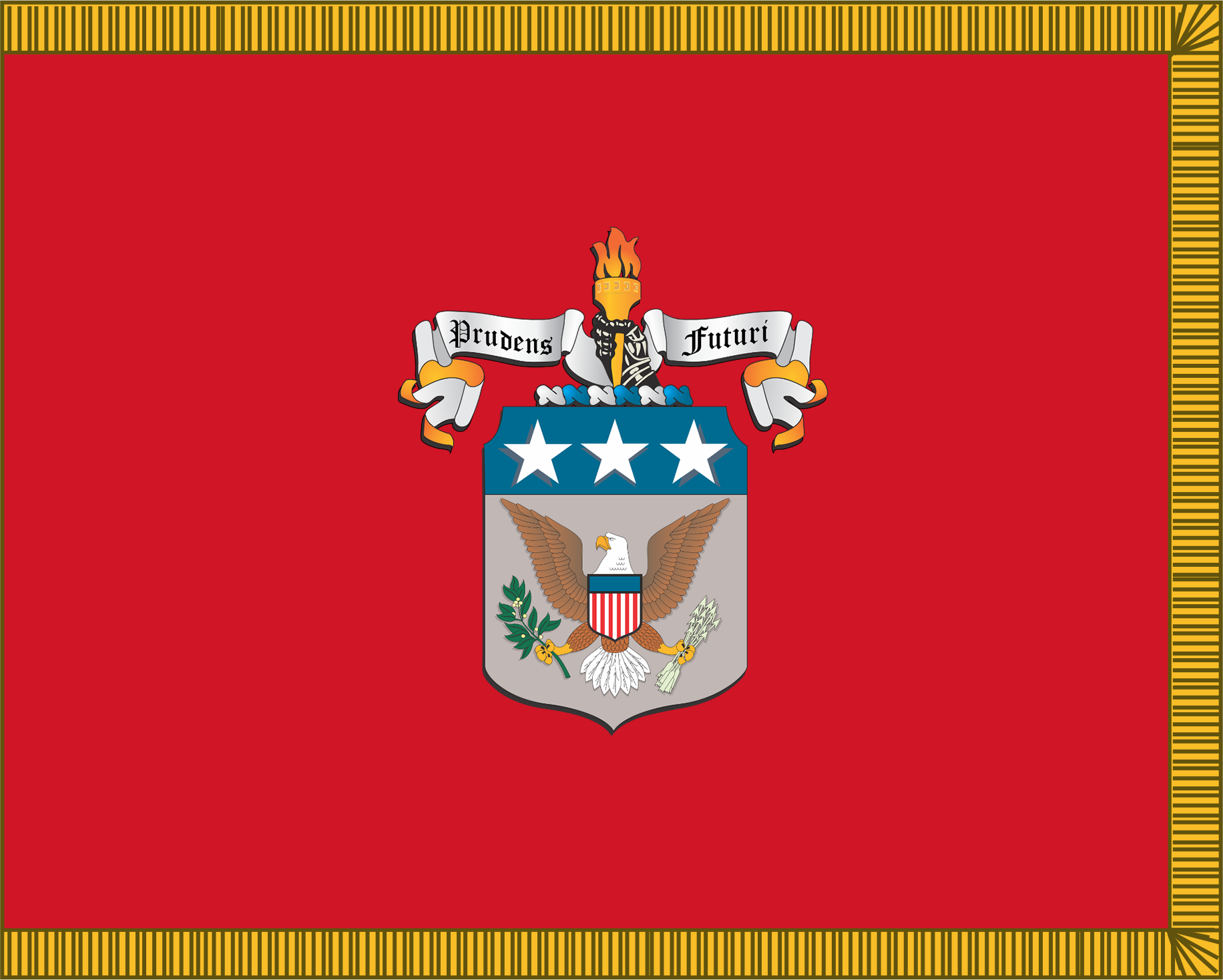
US Army War College Flag

Malin Craig served as commandant prior to being appointed Chief of Staff of the United States Army in 1936, and he was succeeded by Walter S. Grant. The college remained at Washington Barracks until the 1940s, when it was closed due to World War II. It reopened in 1950 at Fort Leavenworth, and moved one year later to its present location.

== Center for Strategic Leadership ==
The Center for Strategic Leadership (CSL) emphasizes experiential education, senior leader education, support to Army senior leader research, and support to both U.S. Army War College (USAWC) and Army Senior Leader strategic communication efforts. CSL's professional staff and Collins Hall facility host, support, develop, and conduct events, including workshops, symposia, conferences, games, and exercises focused on a broad range of strategic leadership and national security issues and concepts in support of the USAWC, the U.S. Army, and the Interagency and Joint Communities.

=== Basic Strategic Art Program ===
The Basic Strategic Art Program is one of the academic programs taught at the U.S. Army War College. When the program was founded in 2003, its purpose was to provide those officers who had been newly designated into Functional Area 59 (Strategist, formerly Strategic Plans & Policy) an introduction to strategy and to the skills, knowledge, and attributes needed as a foundation for their progressive development as army strategists.

FA 59 officers have been deployed to combat since the onset of the war on terror following the September 11 attacks in 2001. Since then, graduates of this program served in key positions in Iraq and Afghanistan, all combatant commands, and at the Pentagon.

== Peacekeeping and Stability Operations Institute ==
The Peacekeeping and Stability Operations Institute (PKSOI) is located at the War College. The institute's mission is to serve as the U.S. Military's Center of Excellence for Stability and Peace Operations at the strategic and operational levels in order to improve military, civilian agency, international, and multinational capabilities and execution.

== Notable alumni ==
- John A. Lejeune, Class of 1910
- Hunter Liggett, Class of 1910
- Samson L. Faison, Class of 1911
- Ben Hebard Fuller, Class of 1914
- John Wilson Ruckman, Class of 1915
- Walter Krueger, Class of 1921
- Charles H. Corlett, Class of 1925
- Edmund L. Gruber, Class of 1927
- Dwight D. Eisenhower, Class of 1928
- Simon Bolivar Buckner Jr., Class of 1929
- Roy Geiger, Class of 1929
- Oscar Griswold, Class of 1929
- Clarence R. Huebner, Class of 1929
- Lesley J. McNair, Class of 1929
- Troy H. Middleton, Class of 1929
- Franklin C. Sibert, Class of 1929
- Willis D. Crittenberger, Class of 1930
- Robert L. Eichelberger, Class of 1930
- Charles P. Hall, Class of 1930
- Jesse B. Oldendorf, Class of 1930
- Frank Jack Fletcher, Class of 1931
- William R. Schmidt, Class of 1931
- Gilbert R. Cook, Class of 1932
- Leonard T. Gerow, Class of 1932
- Wade H. Haislip, Class of 1932
- Thomas Holcomb, Class of 1932
- John P. Lucas, Class of 1932
- Alexander M. Patch, Class of 1932
- George S. Patton Jr., Class of 1932
- Frank M. Andrews, Class of 1933
- George Kenney, Class of 1933
- Edward Almond, Class of 1934
- Omar Bradley, Class of 1934
- Ulysses S. Grant III, Class of 1934
- Lewis Blaine Hershey, Class of 1934
- Ernest N. Harmon, Class of 1934
- Jonathan Wainwright, Class of 1934
- Norman Cota, Class of 1936
- John R. Hodge, Class of 1936
- Richard Marshall, Class of 1936
- Edward H. Brooks, Class of 1937
- Mark W. Clark, Class of 1937
- Matthew Ridgway, Class of 1937
- Walter Bedell Smith, Class of 1937
- J. Lawton Collins, Class of 1938
- Leslie Groves, Class of 1939
- Paul R. Hawley, Class of 1939
- Hoyt Vandenberg, Class of 1939
- Anthony McAuliffe, Class of 1940
- Maxwell D. Taylor, Class of 1940
- Pedro del Valle, Class of 1940
- William Westmoreland, Class of 1951
- Bruce Palmer Jr., Class of 1952
- Creighton Abrams, Class of 1953
- Earl E. Anderson, Class of 1960
- Bernard W. Rogers, Class of 1960
- Lowell Ward Rooks, Class of 1937
- Alexander Haig, Class of 1966
- Donn A. Starry, Class of 1966
- H. Norman Schwarzkopf, Class of 1973
- Lewis Sorley, Class of 1973
- George Joulwan, Class of 1978
- John M. Shalikashvili, Class of 1978
- Gordon R. Sullivan, Class of 1978
- Muhammadu Buhari (Nigerian Army, President of Nigeria), Class of 1980
- William W. Hartzog, Class of 1981
- Richard Myers, Class of 1981
- Clara Leach Adams-Ender, Class of 1982
- Donald Fowler, Class of 1983
- Thomas E. White, Class of 1984
- W. Patrick Lang, Class of 1985
- Tommy Franks, Class of 1985
- James Peake, Class of 1988
- Lance L. Smith, Class of 1990
- Abdulkadir Sheikh Dini (Somali Army), Class of 1990
- William G. Boykin, Class of 1991
- Walter E. Gaskin, Class of 1993
- John Kimmons, Class of 1995
- Raymond T. Odierno, Class of 1995
- Lloyd Austin, Class of 1996
- Chiu Kuo-cheng (Taiwan Minister of National Defense), Class of 1999
- Vijay Kumar Singh (Indian Army), Class of 2001
- Frank J. Corte Jr., Class of 2002
- Parami Kulatunga (Sri Lankan Army), Class of 2003
- Jeffrey W. Talley, Class of 2003
- Bikram Singh, (Indian Army), Class of 2004
- Joe Heck, Class of 2006
- Jeronim Bazo, (Albanian Armed Forces, Chief of the Albanian General Staff) Class of 2006
- Abdel Fattah el-Sisi, (Egyptian Army, President of Egypt) Class of 2006
- Paul M. Nakasone, Class of 2007
- Rizwan Akhtar (Pakistani Army) (Director General Inter-Services Intelligence (ISI)), Class of 2008
- Ihor Hordiichuk, (Ukraine) Class of 2008
- Doug Mastriano, Class of 2010
- Naveed Mukhtar (Pakistani Army) (Director General Inter-Services Intelligence (ISI)), Class of 2011
- Dany Fortin, (Canada) Class of 2016
- Christopher G. Musa, (Nigeria) Class of 2017
- Tracey Poirier, Class of 2017
- Shai Klapper, (Israel) Class of 2017
- Matthew P. Beilfuss, Class of 2018
- Ejup Maqedonci, (Kosovo) Minister of Defense, Class of 2019

== See also ==
- Commandant of the Army War College
- Industrial College of the Armed Forces
- MSC Student Conference on National Affairs
- Shippensburg University of Pennsylvania
- Staff College
- The Institute of World Politics
- United States Army Command and General Staff College
- United States Military Academy
- U.S. Army Strategist

== External links and sources ==
- Strategic Studies Institute of the US Army War College – the college's strategic and security research facility
- Peacekeeping and Stability Operations Institute website
- US Military Strategists Association
- Strategic Experiential Education Group – the college's Strategic Experiential Education Group
- The College's quarterly refereed journal (Parameters), for senior military professionals
- U. S. Army heraldic entitlements for the War College
- What Is the War College, Anyway?, a May 2004 article from Slate
- Works by United States Army War College at LibriVox (public domain audiobooks)
