= Medal of Military Service (2022) =

Military decoration of the Republic of Albania

- Native name: Medalja e Shërbimit Ushtarak
- Type: State medal
- Awarded for: Dedication and contribution in service of national interests and the responsible performance of duties.
- Country: Albania
- Presented by: Minister of Defence
- Eligibility: Military and civilian personnel of the Albanian Armed Forces; foreign military personnel
- Status: Currently constituted
- Established: 28 March 2024
- Ribbon bar

The Medal of Military Service (Albanian: Medalja e Shërbimit Ushtarak; MSHU) is a state decoration of Albania conferred on military and civilian members of the Albanian Armed Forces. It is awarded in recognition of dedication to military service, contributions to national interests and the responsible performance of official duties.

== Award criteria ==
The medal is bestowed on military and civilian personnel of the Albanian Armed Forces for their dedication and contribution to national interests and for the responsible fulfilment of their duties.

It may also be awarded to foreign military personnel in recognition of distinguished merit and significant contributions to the Armed Forces of the Republic.

== Grades ==
The Medal of Military Service consists of three grades, arranged in descending order of precedence:

- Gold (Albanian: Medalja e Artë e Shërbimit Ushtarak)
- Silver (Albanian: Medalja e Argjendtë e Shërbimit Ushtarak)
- Bronze (Albanian: Medalja e Bronztë e Shërbimit Ushtarak)

The criteria governing the award of the medal are determined by a decision of the Council of Ministers, on the proposal of the minister responsible for the Armed Forces.

== Insignia ==
The design of the Medal of Military Service was modelled on the military decorations used in European and NATO member states. Its central motif is a double-headed Albanian eagle in the Art Deco style of the 1930s, holding swords in its talons and surmounted by Skanderbeg's helmet, depicted heraldically facing left.

The inscription Shërbim Ushtarak ("Military Service") appears across the span of the eagle's wings. The insignia is issued in gold, silver and bronze, corresponding to the medal's three grades.

== See also ==
- Orders, decorations, and medals of Albania
- Albanian Armed Forces
