= Joint forces =

Joint forces may refer to:

== Military ==
- Allied Joint Force Command Brunssum, NATO multinational military command located in Belgium
- Albanian Joint Forces Command, controls the Albanian Armed Forces
- Joint Force Headquarters, Royal Brunei Armed Forces
- Canadian Joint Operations Command
- Indian Armed Forces Tri-Service Commands
- Joint Forces Maneuver Regiment (Italy), a military logistics regiment of the Italian Armed Forces
- Joint Forces Command (Malaysia), a joint military command to command tasks in joint operations
- Headquarters Joint Forces New Zealand, the New Zealand Defence Force's operational level headquarters
  - Commander Joint Forces New Zealand, a senior appointment in the New Zealand Defence Force
- Chief of Joint Operations (Sweden)
  - Joint Forces Command (Sweden), a former senior command staff in the Swedish Armed Forces
- Joint Forces Operation (Ukraine)
- Strategic Command (United Kingdom), previously known as Joint Forces Command
  - Permanent Joint Headquarters
  - Joint Aviation Command
    - Joint Special Forces Aviation Wing
- United States Joint Forces Command
  - Joint Forces Staff College, a military staff college in Virginia
  - Joint Forces Training Base - Los Alamitos, a joint military base in California

== Police ==
- Puerto Rico Joint Forces of Rapid Action, an agency within the Puerto Rico Police
