= Jeronim Bazo =

Albanian military officer

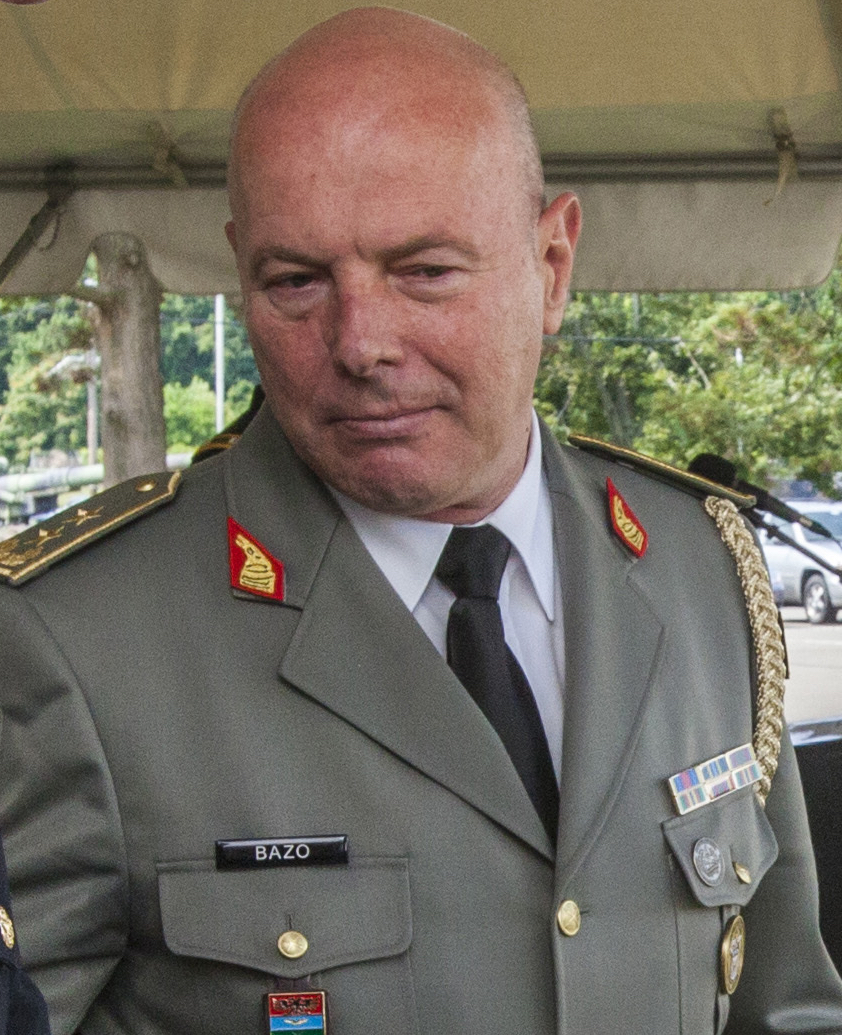
- Maj. Gen. Jeronim Bazo

Chief of General Staff of Albanian Armed Forces
- Incumbent
- Assumed office 7 November 2013
- President: Bujar Nishani
- Minister of Defense: Mimi Kodheli
- Preceded by: Xhemal Gjunkshi

Personal details
- Born: 1960 (age 65–66) Tirana, People's Socialist Republic of Albania
- Spouse: Married
- Children: 2
- Education: Albanian Military Academy “Skënderbej” United States Army War College
- Profession: Military officer

Military service
- Allegiance: PSR Albania (1985–1991); Republic of Albania (since 1991)
- Branch/service: Albanian People's Army (1985–1991); Albanian Armed Forces (since 1991)
- Years of service: 1985-present
- Rank: Major General

Jeronim Bazo is a retired Albanian military officer, currently serving as Director of RACVIAC – Center for Security Cooperation. From 7 November 2013, until January 2017, he served as the Chief of General Staff of the Albanian Armed Forces.

== Early military career ==
Bazo graduated from the Albanian Military Academy “Skënderbej” in 1985. He immediately became an officer, serving as a platoon leader, infantry company commander, battalion executive officer, and an instructor at a military school. Bazo was promoted to captain in 1991.

From 1993 to 1995, Bazo served as head of section for the Personnel Department of the Albanian Ministry of Defence. Bazo was promoted to major in 1994, while in the Personnel Department, and to lieutenant colonel in 1995. In 1996, he graduated from the George C. Marshall European Center for Security Studies. He then served as director of the newly established Department for National Security at the Albanian Defence Academy.

From 1997 to 2000, Bazo served as NATO Liaison Officer in the Albanian MoD. From 2000 to October 2002, Bazo was the Commandant of the Albanian Non-Commissioned Officer Academy. From 2003 to June 2005, Bazo commanded the Albanian Military Academy. During this time, Bazo led efforts to transform the military commissioning undergraduate school to a Military University.

In 2006, Bazo graduated from the United States Army War College with a master's degree in Strategic Studies. Bazo was promoted to colonel in the same year.

From 2010 to 2012, Bazo led the Defence Planning and Monitoring Division (J5) at the Albanian General Staff.

In 2012, Bazo was promoted to brigadier general and was made the Defence and Security Adviser to President Bujar Nishani.

== Chief of General Staff ==
In 2013, Bazo was made the new Chief of General Staff of Albanian Armed Forces by Presidential Decree Number 8372, issued by President Nishani. He was promoted to major general by the same decree.

In September 2015, Bazo was inducted into the United States Army War College's hall of fame.

== Personal life ==
Bazo is married and has 2 children. Bazo's daughter, Orarta Bazo, attended a U.S. high school while her father was a student at the United States Army War College.

== Timeline of Ranks ==
Insignia	Rank	Date
	Captain	1991
	Major	1994
	Lieutenant Colonel	1995
	Colonel	2006
	Brigadier General	2012
	Major General	7 November 2013

== See also ==
- Albanian Army
- Chief of the Albanian General Staff
