= Stefan Shundi =

Albanian writer (1906-1947)

- Born: Stefan Shundi; 1906; Tirana, Ottoman Empire
- Died: 1947 (aged 40–41)
- Resting place: Tirana, Albania
- Education: Law
- Alma mater: University of Milan
- Occupations: writer, journalist, football player, club president and sports director, lawyer
- Writing career
- Pen name: Gjergj Kuka, Nichts
- Language: Albanian
- Years active: 1930-1947
- Period: 1930s and 1940s
- Genres: Drama, novels, literary critic articles, and newspaper articles
- Subjects: Albanian folklore, Albanian poetry critique
- Notable works: “Kalorësi i vdekjes ose Kostandini e Geruntina” (The death knight, or Konstandine and Geruntine)
- Movements: Neo-Albanianism and idealistic critique

Stefan Shundi (1906–1947) was an Albanian writer, literary critic, journalist, lawyer, football player, and sports director. During 1933 to 1936 he was president of the KF Tirana football association.

== Life ==
Stefan Shundi was born in 1906 in Tirana (then part of the Ottoman Empire, now the capital of Albania). He pursued his secondary studies in Austria and then in Italy, where he graduated in law at the University of Milan. In 1929, Shundi was selected from the Albanian government of Zog I, along with other Albanian students, to participate, in an official ceremony to honor Lodewijk Thomson in the Netherlands. Thomson had been a Dutch military who died in Albania in 1914, while commanding the International Control Commission (Albania), as a unit of protection of a newly created Albania.

After graduation in Italy, Shundi returned to Tirana to practice law, which he continued until his death in 1947.

In 1927 Shundi was one of the founders of the football association KF Tirana, of which he continued to be a player until 1929 when he became the club's sports director. On 10 July 1930 he kept as a sports director the victory speech of the first football championship of Albania. From 1933 to 1936, he was the club's president.

As a journalist, Shundi published (also with the pen names of Gjergj Kuka or Nichts) various articles in different organs of the 1930s and 1940s, such as "Minerva", "Arbënia", "Shkëndija", and "Leka." ecc.) During 1941-1943 Shundi also contributed to the publication of the Drini magazine, a monthly periodical which promoted tourism in Albania.

As a literary critic, he wrote (often with polemic tones), about the contemporary poetry of notable Albanian authors, such as Gjergj Fishta, Vinçens Prennushi, and Lasgush Poradeci. He well described Fishta's character through typical stories of the priest's life, which reveal his wit and good nature. Albeit eclectic, his critique is said to have been influenced by the Italian idealistic critique of Benedetto Croce.

In 1937 Shundi published a drama with folklore themes, “Kalorësi i vdekjes ose Kostandini e Geruntina” (The death knight, or Konstandine and Geruntine). He has left three unpublished manuscripts: "Dy titanët – Skënderbeu e Moisi Golemi” (The two titans - Scanderbeg and Moisi Golemi), “Votra e gjyshit – shënime historike” (The grandfather's fireplace - historic notes), and the novel "Nanë moj” (O mother). Shundi, along with other writers in the 1930s, is deemed to have improved the quality of literature in the 1930s, by giving it a much more colorful expressiveness and making it more modern.

Together with other literary critics of the time, such as Nebil Çika, Ernest Koliqi, Asim Jakova, and Tahir Gjinali, Shundi belonged to the "reactionary" current of the neo-Albanianism of philosopher Branko Merxhani.

Shundi died in 1947 in mysterious circumstances. In recognition of his contributions as a literary critic and as former SK Tirana president, a street of Tirana bears his name.
