= MEICO =

State-owned company of Albania

MEICO (Military Export Import Company) is a state-owned company run by the Ministry of Defense of Albania. The company was created in 1991 by order of the Minister of Defense to fulfill the needs of Albanian Armed Forces.

== History ==
The company was formed in 1991 after the fall of communism in the country, by the Council of Ministers Nr. 366 date 05.10.1991 "On establishment of the Company Import - Export reports to the Ministry of Defense". The company originally started to "manage" the remaining stores of military equipment they inherited from the soviet days, but practically functioned as a company to sell excess weapons inherited to other countries to gain the income for the albanian state.From 1 June 2009, all commercial entities, private or state, who have as their object of activity the import, export, transit, transshipin, brokering, transfer or exposure of military goods and goods and technologies with dual-use included in the list of control of the European Union and approved by the Council of Ministers of the Republic of Albania, no. 1569, datë 19.11.2008. 1569, dated 19.11.2008. are legally obliged to licensed or authorized in advance by the State Authority for the Export Control (ANA), according to the procedures and powers provided by legislation of the Republic of Albania. The company in 2013 sold weapons to syrian opposition during the syrian conflict.
