= Chief of the General Staff (Albania) =

Chief of the General Staff of the Albanian Armed Forces

- Shef i Shtabit të Përgjithshëm
- Emblem of the Albanian General Staff

- Standard of the Chief of Defence
- Incumbent; Arben Kingji since 3 August 2022
- Member of: General Staff
- Reports to: Minister of Defence
- Nominator: Prime Minister
- Appointer: President
- Formation: 4 May 1913; 113 years ago
- First holder: Lt. Colonel Ali Shefqet Shkupi

The Chief of the General Staff (Albanian: Shef i Shtabit të Përgjithshëm) is the chief of the General Staff and Albanian Armed Forces. The chief of staff is appointed by the President of Albania, who is the commander-in-chief. The position was established on 4 May 1913 as part of the Provisional Government of Albania.

== List of chiefs of the general staff ==
=== Provisional Government of Albania / Principality of Albania ===
Date of term's end is based on start of successor's term.

No.	Portrait	Chief of the General Staff	Took office	Left office	Time in office	Ref.
1	Ali Shefqet Shkupi	Lieutenant Colonel; Ali Shefqet Shkupi (1883–1953 )	4 May 1913	November 1920	7 years, 5 months	
2	Ali Riza Kolonja	Brigadier General; Ali Riza Kolonja (1880–1930 )	November 1920	December 1921	1 year, 1 month	
3	Xhavid Leskoviku	Major; Xhavid Leskoviku (1882–1945?)	December 1921	June 1923	1 year, 6 months	
4	Bajram Fevziu	Major; Bajram Fevziu (1884–1928 ) Term ended with dissolution of the Ministry of War	June 1923	24 December 1924	1 year, 6 months	

=== Albanian Republic / Albanian Kingdom ===
In 1925, Prime Minister Ahmet Zogolli created a new constitution for Albania, forming the Albanian Republic. On 1 September 1928, Zogolli amended the constitution, dissolved parliament, and proclaimed himself King, creating the Albanian Kingdom. The Kingdom collapsed following the Italian invasion of Albania.

No.	Portrait	Chief of the General Staff	Took office	Left office	Time in office	President of Albania	Ref.
Albanian National Army
5	Gustav von Myrdacz	Divisional General; Gustav von Myrdacz (1874–1945)	18 January 1925	1 September 1928	3 years, 227 days	Ahmet Zogolli	
Royal Albanian Army						King of Albania	Ref.
(5)	Gustav von Myrdacz	General; Gustav von Myrdacz (1874–1945)	1 September 1928	7 April 1939	10 years, 218 days	Zog I of Albania	

=== Communist Albania ===
The following individuals served during the era of communism in Albania, serving the National Liberation Movement, the Democratic Government of Albania, and the People's Socialist Republic of Albania. In this time, the powers of Commander-in-chief were held by the First Secretary of the Party of Labour of Albania.

No.	Portrait	Chief of the General Staff	Took office	Left office	Time in office	First Secretary	Ref.
Albanian National Liberation Army
6	Spiro Moisiu	Major General; Spiro Moisiu (1900–1981 )	10 July 1943	24 May 1944	319 days	Enver Hoxha	
Albanian People's Army
(6)	Spiro Moisiu	Major General; Spiro Moisiu (1900–1981 ) (Note: Became Chief of the General Staff following the Congress of Përmet.)	24 May 1944	August 1946	2 years, 2 months	Enver Hoxha	
7	Mehmet Shehu	Colonel General; Mehmet Shehu (1913–1981 )	August 1946	28 January 1948	1 year, 5 months	Enver Hoxha	
8	Beqir Balluku	Lieutenant General; Beqir Balluku (1917–1974 ) (Note: Executed for high treason in 1974.)	28 January 1948	1952	3–4 years	Enver Hoxha	
9	Petrit Dume	Lieutenant General; Petrit Dume (1920–1975 )	1952	1954	1–2 years	Enver Hoxha	
10	Arif Hasko	Lieutenant General; Arif Hasko (1918–1991 )	1954	1956	1–2 years	Enver Hoxha	
(9)	Petrit Dume	Lieutenant General; Petrit Dume (1920–1975 ) (Note: On 1 May 1966, military ranks were abolished in the Albanian Armed Forces, following the example of the Chinese People's Liberation Army. In 1991 the rank system was reestablished under President Ramiz Alia.) (Note: Dismissed and executed for high treason in 1975.)	1956	July 1974	17–18 years	Enver Hoxha	
11	Sami Meçollari	Sami Meçollari (born 1937)	July 1974	December 1974	5 months	Enver Hoxha	
12	Veli Llakaj [sq]	Veli Llakaj (1935–2011 )	December 1974	13 October 1982	7 years, 10 months	Enver Hoxha	
13	Kiço Mustaqi	Kiço Mustaqi (1938–2019 )	13 October 1982	February 1991	8 years, 3 months	Enver Hoxha (1941 – 1985); Ramiz Alia (1985 – 1991)	

=== Republic of Albania ===
The following individuals served following the fall of communism in Albania and the formation of the Republic of Albania. The new Albanian constitution shifted the powers of Commander in Chief to the newly formed office of the President of Albania.

No.	Portrait	Chief of the General Staff	Took office	Left office	Time in office	President of Albania	Ref.
14	Halim Abazi	Colonel; Halim Abazi (born 1944)	February 1991	June 1991	4 months	Ramiz Alia	
15	Kostaq Karoli [sq]	General; Kostaq Karoli (1945–2025)	June 1991	August 1992	1 year, 2 months	Ramiz Alia (1991 – 1992); Kastriot Islami (1992 – 1992); Pjetër Arbnori (1992 – 1992); Sali Berisha (1992 – 1997)	
16	Ilia Vasho	General; Ilia Vasho (born 1944)	August 1992	1994	1–2 years	Sali Berisha	
17	Sheme Kosova	General; Sheme Kosova (born 1949) (Note: Dismissed following the Albanian Rebellion of 1997.)	1994	2 March 1997	2–3 years	Sali Berisha	
18	Adem Çopani	Major General; Adem Çopani (1944–2018 ) (Note: Served during the Albanian Rebellion of 1997.)	2 March 1997	August 1997	1 year, 2 months	Sali Berisha (1992 – 1997); Rexhep Meidani (1997 – 2002)	
19	Aleks Andoni	Brigadier General; Aleks Andoni (born 1956)	September 1997	2000	2–3 years	Rexhep Meidani	
20	Pëllumb Qazimi	General; Pëllumb Qazimi (1957– )	2000	2006	5–6 years	Rexhep Meidani (1997 – 2002); Alfred Moisiu (2002 – 2007)	
21	Luan Hoxha	Lieutenant General; Luan Hoxha (born 1960)	October 2006	June 2008	1 year, 8 months	Alfred Moisiu (2002 – 2007); Bamir Topi (2007 – 2012)	
22	Maksim Malaj [sq]	Major General; Maksim Malaj (1958– )	June 2008	8 August 2011	3 years, 2 months	Bamir Topi	
23	Xhemal Gjunkshi	Major General; Xhemal Gjunkshi (1963– )	8 August 2011	8 November 2013	2 years, 92 days	Bamir Topi (2007 – 2012); Bujar Nishani (2012 – 2017)	
24	Jeronim Bazo	Major General; Jeronim Bazo (born 1960)	8 November 2013	January 2017	3 years, 1 month	Bujar Nishani	
25	Bardhyl Kollçaku	Brigadier General; Bardhyl Kollçaku (1967– )	28 October 2017	29 July 2020	2 years, 275 days	Ilir Meta	.
26	Bajram Begaj	Major General; Bajram Begaj (1967– )	29 July 2020	4 June 2022	1 year, 310 days	Ilir Meta	.
27	Arben Kingji	Lieutenant General; Arben Kingji (1970– )	3 August 2022	Incumbent	4 years, 35 days	Bajram Begaj	

== See also ==
- General Staff of the Armed Forces (Albania)
- Albanian Armed Forces
