= Albanian Military Exhibition =

Albanian fair for defense and security

Albanian Military Exhibition (ALMEX) is an international fair for defense and security industries, technology and innovation which takes place in Tirana. ALMEX is open to different security industries worldwide as well visitors from outside Albania. It is developed through 28-29-30 October.
