= Ali Shefqet Shkupi =

Albanian military personnel

Ali Shefqet Shkupi Bey
- Ali Shefqet Shkupi
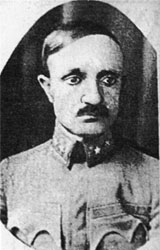
- Born: Ali Hysen Shefqeti; September 1883; Uskub, Ottoman Empire
- Died: 3 December 1953 (aged 70); Shkoder, Albania
- Burial place: Tirana, Albania
- Military career
- Allegiance: Ottoman Empire (1905 - 1912); Principality of Albania (April 1913 - December 1924)
- Rank: Lieutenant Colonel
- Awards: "Patriotic Activity of First Class" (Albania)

Lieutenant Colonel Ali Shefqet Shkupi, also known as Ali Shefqet Bey, was the first Chief of Supreme Staff of the Albanian Army bearing the functions of the Supreme Commander in the Albanian Government of Ismail Qemal Vlora.

== Family ==
Ali Shefqeti was the son of Hysen Shefqeti, and Albanian originating from Peja who had settled in Skopje. His mother was a local Albanian woman from a rich family. Ali was born in Skopje in September 1883. His brother was Naxhi Shkupi, another Albanian nationalist who invested most of his wealth into the Albanian new state.

== Education ==
Ali received his elementary education in Salonika, later studied at the Monastir Military High School, the Turkish Military Academy (Kara Harp Okulu), and finally Academy of General Staff in Istanbul, which he completed in 1905. At the end of the academy he was given the rank captain. Later, he served various positions in the Ottoman Third Army in Macedonia. He supported the Young Turks movement, being part of the military units which attacked Istanbul in 1908. (See: Young Turk Revolution)

== Albanian Army ==
Disappointed from the Young Turks, and taking advantage of his location in Macedonia where most of the Albanian nationalist movements were situated, he got in touch with Albanian patriotic circles. The end of Albanian Revolt of 1912 would find him in Istanbul with the rank major (binbashi). Ali Shkupi received information that he was on the list to get arrested, therefore escaped to Romania with the support of Albanian community. Later he moved in Trieste (back then part of Austro-Hungary). In March 1913, he participated in the Albanian Congress of Trieste.

Ali Shkupi could not reach Vlora because of the blockage from the Greek Navy although his desire was to join the Albanian government. He managed to land near Fier (Seman delta) area from an Austro-Hungarian ship. He was immediately assigned with the organization of the Ministry of War which he succeeded. Ali Shkupi put in place all the experience he had gathered from the extended military education and military service in the Ottoman Army. On May 5, 1913, Vlora Government would approve the "Statute for the temporary organization of the Ministry of War", and the General Staff Office which he was in command of. The newly created Ministry of War would also have Back Lines Office, Personnel Office, and Medical Office. The statute was detailed and included all necessary structures and mechanisms of a modern army.

== Military service ==
On 31 May 1913, the General Staff of Shkupi informed the Albanian Ministry of War for the creation of "model" military units, which would server as basis for the army. The Albanian Army so far consisted mostly of irregulars. Shkupi proposed the mandatory military service. He also built a special commission engaged with military terminology, together with former Ottoman military figures Mustafa Maksuti and Kamber Sejdini (the later an Albanian from Elbasan, who had served as French language teacher in the Monastir Military High School).
After the resignation of Ismail Qemali's government on 22 January 1914, Shkupi still held high military positions under Prince Wied. With the break out of World War I, he settled in Shkoder. With the Montenegrin occupation of Shkoder, he got arrested and released only in 1916 when Austro-Hungary invaded Montenegro. He was a supporter of Congress of Lushnje. The government that came out of the congress in January 1920 would assign him first "Commander of the General Command", and later "Chief of the General Staff" (after the recreation of the Ministry of War).

== June Revolution and King Zog ==
Ali Shkupi was a supporter of Hasan Prishtina and the June Revolution of Bishop Noli. With the return of Ahmet Zogu in power in December 1924, he would be arrested and interned twice. He was accused as a main organizer of the Fier Revolt of 1935, and got sentenced to death, but due to protests from inside and outside Albania, he was sentenced to jail and released in 1938.

== World War II and after ==
Ali Shkupi was not active during World War II, although he was an opponent of the Italian invasion, as well as the German one. The Nazis would burn his house in Tirana. After the war, he resettled in Shkodër. He died on 3 December 1953 and was buried in Shkoder. He was reburied in Tirana in the '80s. In 1992, Ali Shefqet Shkupi was decorated for "Patriotic Activity of First Class" by the Albanian government.
