= Minerva (Albanian magazine) =

Minerva was an Albanian language literary magazine.

Minerva started in 1932 as a biweekly and later was published monthly. Directed by journalist Nebil Çika, it ceased publication in 1936.

== History ==
Minerva focused mainly on literary critique of fictional books. Its contributors included Tajar Zavalani, Odise Paskali, Ikbale Çika, and Stefan Shundi. According to Blendi Fevziu, Minerva was one of the best known magazines of modern life on Albania at the time, and had a relevant influence on the cultural life of Albania.

Minerva published its first issue in 1932. Thirty-eight issues were published until 1936, when publication ceased.
