= Rapid Reaction Brigade (Albania) =

Albanian Army Rapid Reaction Brigade Brigada e Reagimit të Shpejtë
- Active: 6 January 2001
- Country: Albania
- Branch: Albanian Land Forces
- Part of: Albanian Armed Forces
- Garrison/HQ: Tirana

The Albanian Rapid Reaction Brigade was created on 6 January 2001. It is the core unit of the Albanian Land Forces. In January 2003 there was the first structural reorganization and since November 2006 we have the current organization. It is considered a first priority unit of the Albanian Armed Forces.

== Mission ==
The Brigade carries out offensive and defensive operations, Peace Support Operations and humanitarian assistance.

== Equipment ==
- TT pistol
- Makarov pistol
- Heckler & Koch MP5
- AK-47
- Type 54 HMG
- RPD machine gun
- Dragunov sniper rifle
- 60 mm mortar
- 81 mm mortar
- 120 mm mortar
- Type 66 152 mm towed gun-howitzer
- RPG-7

== Peacetime Structure ==
The Rapid Reaction Brigade has its Command and HQ, 3 Infantry battalions, 1 Logistic Battalion, 1 Artillery Battalion, 1 Engineer Battalion, and 4 Subordinate Companies（Reconnaissance, NBC Protection, Signal, Military Police.

== See also ==
- Albanian Air Force
- Albanian Naval Defense Forces
