= Arben Kingji =

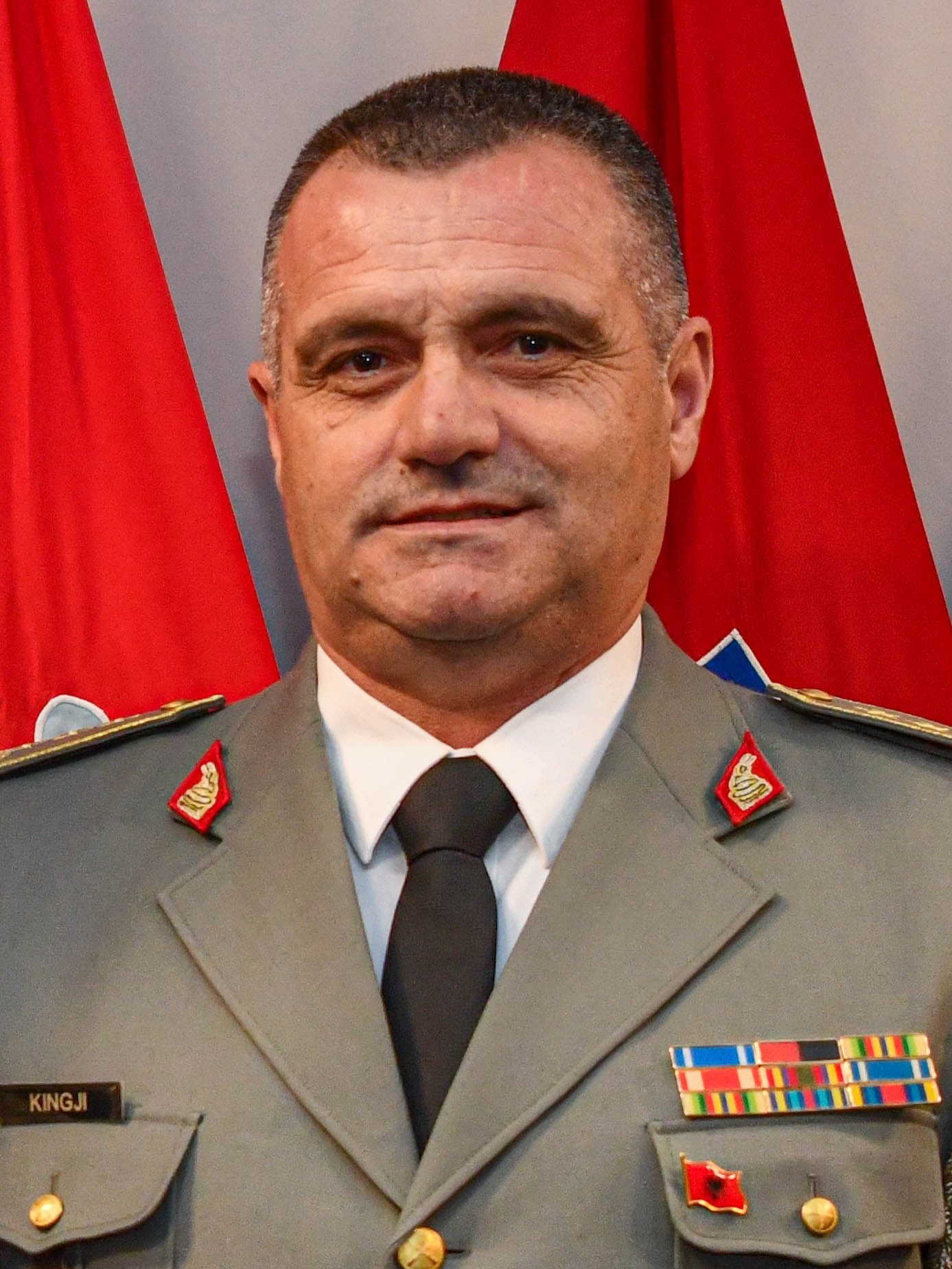
Kingji in 2025.

Arben Voke Kingji (born December 22, 1970, in Kukës) is an Albanian general who has since 2022 served as Chief of the General Staff of the Armed Forces of Albania.

== Early life and career ==
In 1993, he graduated from the Skanderbeg Military Academy in Tirana and received his first officer rank. He served in Unit 9001 as a platoon commander. In 1999, he completed a course for special forces officers in Turkey. After returning to the country, he served as an operational group commander and then as a special forces battalion commander. In 2016, he graduated with a law degree from Winsdom University.

During his career, he served as an infantry battalion commander, a military police battalion commander, and also served as a military attaché in Bucharest. In September 2020, he was promoted to the first rank of general, and in October 2020, he took command of the Albanian Land Forces. From 2003 to 2012, he served as commander of the Albanian contingent in Afghanistan, and in 2006, he commanded the contingent in Iraq. In 2003, he was awarded the Golden Decoration of the Eagle.

On August 2, 2022, he was promoted to the position of Chief of the General Staff, and in December 2024, he was promoted to the rank of Lieutenant General. His mandate was renewed on 11 August 2025.

He is married and has two children.
