= Support Command (Albania) =

Support Command of Albania
- Komanda Mbështetëse
- Coat of arms of the KM
- Founded: 2000; 25 years ago
- Country: Albania
- Branch: Albanian Armed Forces
- Type: Army Command
- Role: Military logistics
- Garrison/HQ: Vaqarr, Tirana
- Nickname: "KM"
- Website: Official website

Commanders
- Commander: Brigadier General Aleksandër Pando

Insignia
- Ceremonial flag of the KM

- Patch insignia of KM

The Albanian Support Command (Albanian: Komanda Mbështetëse, KM) is a supporting command of the Albanian Armed Forces, which has as its primary mission the support of the Armed Forces in the areas of procurement and supply, maintenance, transport, inventory, medical supply, and supporting civil-military cooperation for these issues. The Support Command and logistic support units of the AAF should be able to accomplish all requirements to enable logistics sustainment of force operations in every kind of environment.

The KM adapts its operational capacity and capability as required, to support the objectives of the Military Strategy, in accordance with priorities, to assure adequate and timely support of forces. To support the Armed Forces in times of peace, crisis, and war, the KM has mobile units and the capability to support the participation of the Armed Forces to accomplish their missions, including bilateral and multilateral engagements as well as those with NATO forces.

== History ==
On November 14, 1947, after the Second World War, the communist government of the time ruled the creation of the Central Dependence of Intent (DQI). A year later it was renamed under the name Central Army Warehouse. In 1949, a structure was established for the first time, which as primary duty has to organize all the military stores of the country. The structure were identified under the name of Department No. 8770, staying active until 1993, the time when it was abolished.

In 1993, after the abolition of the previous structure, the army stores were identified as the Army Supply Bases, of which the largest bases were located in Tirana, Elbasan, Berat and Rreshen.

On December 17, 2000, the Logistic Support Command (KML) was established as a supporting structure of Commands and autonomous units and installations of General Staff. Creating this structure enabled the centralization of logistic support on behalf of Armed Forces. The Army Supply Bases was included also in the KML structure. The Logistic Support Command's activity was a progress in provision, distribution, transport, maintenance, administration, recollection of armament & munitions, hot-spot cleaning, laboratory tests, etc. In 2003, the Logistic Support Command endured changes into the new organization structure. at the event of AAF restructuring. In January 2007, pursuant to the reformation process of AAF, was reorganized into Support Command, which was in its composition the Logistic Brigade (established after the superseding of the Brigade of Supply and Transportation), the General Staff Support Regiment, Infrastructure Regiment, Personnel-Recruitment Center, Central Military Hospital (CMH), Military Police Battalion.

Based on the order of the Chief of General Staff of the Armed Forces, No.31 dated 24.02.2010, the Support Command is suppressed and on its basis the Logistic Brigade is reorganized.

In 2014, upon the order of the Minister of Defense No.603, dated 23.07.2014, the Logistic Brigade and the Regional Support Brigade were abolished and on their basis was reorganized the Support Command. The essence of this change stands in the new level and quality necessary for logistic services in Albanian Armed Forces.

== Mission and tasks ==
The logistics system is being developed and modernized by considering the following tasks and objectives:

- Provide operational capabilities and combat readiness capabilities anytime necessary to respond to the threats and risks to the realization of the constitutional mission.
- To support the activities of the Albanian Armed Forces (AAF) with all levels of supply (1-5) and logistic services.
- Provide necessary operational capacity to conduct military operations, civil emergencies, search and rescue, humanitarian operations and to help the community in collaboration with other structures of the Armed Forces.
- Provide operational capacity needed to improve the infrastructure of AAF.
- Provide necessary operational capacities for research, detection, clearance and destruction of dangerous ammunition and explosives in operations at home and abroad.
- Provide support of Armed structures with repairing, general motor maintenance of ground specialized vehicles in operations at home and outside the country in peacetime, in crisis, war and civil emergency.
- To support the transport of AAF structures at home and abroad.
- Provide medical support to active military personnel, on reserve or retired, to their families and to civilian employees of the Armed Forces.
- Administer, manage ammunition, weapons, techniques and backup equipment of AAF.
- Maintain, manage materials, monetary values, the use of backup equipment, according to grades and levels of supply.
- Provide through CIMIC, training and preparation of military and civilian personnel for specific tasks that are sent on missions abroad.
- To educate, train and qualify officers, NCOs and soldiers of the Armed Forces structures in the specialty of supply, transportation, maintenance, engineers, personnel-administration, weapons - ammo and health in the interest of fulfilling their mission.

== Structure ==
The Support Command consists of:

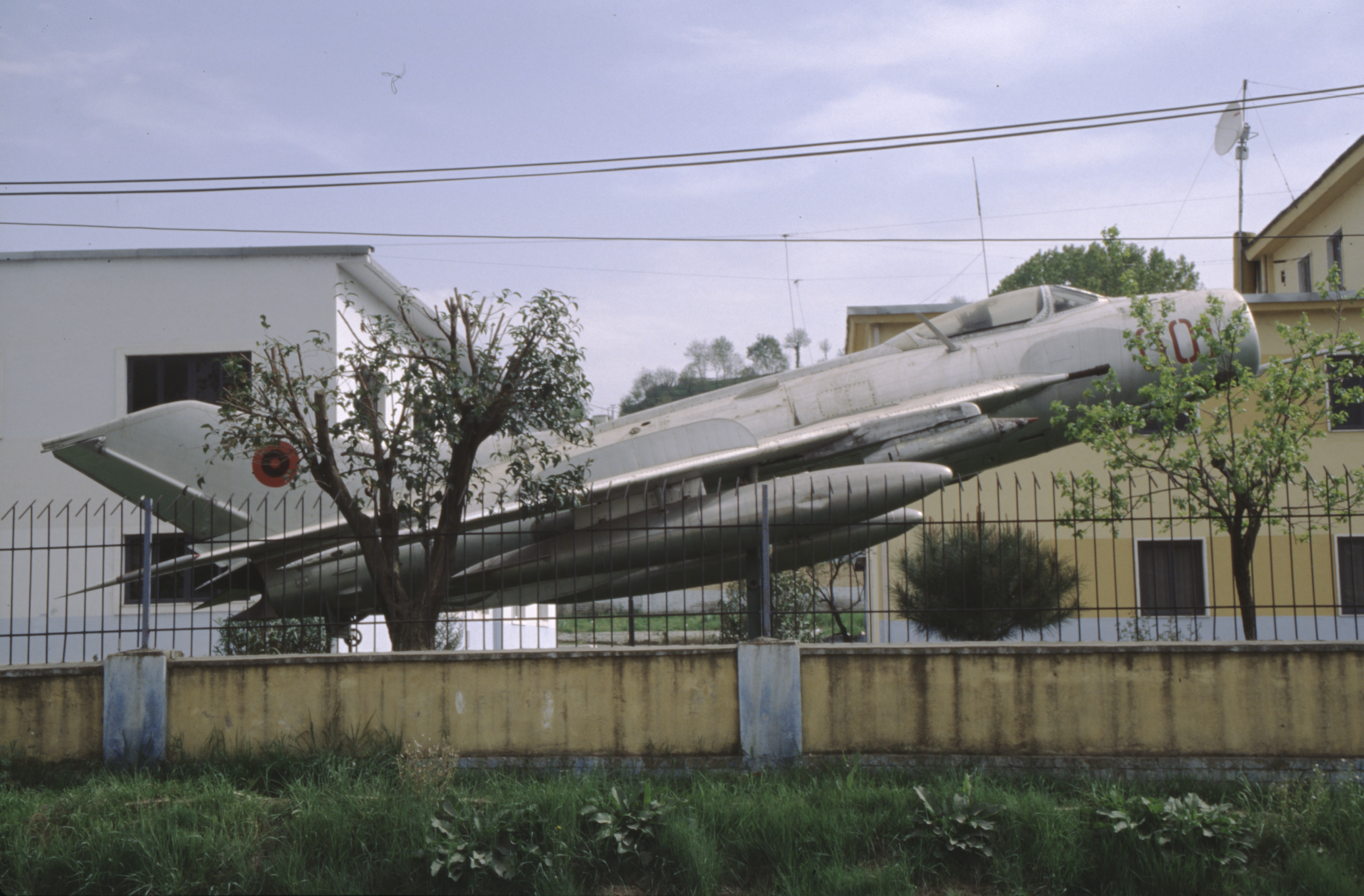
Former MiG jet in front of the Support Command's headquarters in Vaqarr

- Support Command, in Vaqarr
  - Staff Support Company, in Vaqarr
  - Engineer Battalion, in Ferraj
    - Command and Staff
    - Construction Company
    - Explosive Ordnance Disposal Company
    - Bridge Company, Support Company
  - Supply Battalion, in Pezë Helmës
  - Transport Battalion, in Bregu i Lumit
  - Regional Support Battalion, in Tirana
  - Armed Forces Repair and Maintenance Center, in Vaqarr
  - Civil Emergencies and Support Base - BMEC
  - Mengel Regional Support Detachment with Reservists, in Mengel
  - Armed Forces Central Laboratory, in Ferraj
  - Training Center, in Sauk

== See also ==
- Albanian Armed Forces
- Albanian Land Force
- Albanian Naval Force
- Albanian Air Force
