= Turkish War Academies =

Former educational branch of the Turkish Armed Forces

Turkish War Academies Türk Harp Akademileri
- Logo of the Turkish War Academies
- Active: 20 July 1848 - 31 July 2016 (reorganized as five War Institutes)
- Country: Turkey
- Type: Staff colleges & Military academy
- Role: Military education and training
- Part of: Turkish Armed Forces

Turkish War Academies (Turkish: Türk Harp Akademileri) was an educational branch of the Turkish Armed Forces which trained it's staff officers. After the 2016 Turkish coup d'état attempt it closed and five separate institutes were established in its place;Land War Institute, Air War Institute, Naval War Institute, Joint War Institute, Strategic Studies War Institute. All of them are part the National Defence University. It was founded in 1848.
