= General Staff of the Armed Forces (Albania) =

Highest military structure in the Albanian Armed Forces

- Shtabi i Përgjithshëm i Forcave të Armatosura
- Official Emblem
- Founded: 1913; 113 years ago
- Country: Albania
- Type: Armed forces headquarters
- Part of: Albanian Armed Forces
- Headquarters: Tirana, Albania
- Nickname: GS

Commanders
- Chief of the General Staff: Lieutenant General Arben Kingji
- Deputy Chief of the General Staff: Brigadier General Altin Kurti
- Director of the General Staff: Brigadier General Ardian Lilo

Insignia
- Flag

The General Staff of the Armed Forces (GS; Albanian: Shtabi i Përgjithshëm i Forcave të Armatosura), is the highest military structure of the Albanian Armed Forces. It was established as a joint strategic staff and functions according to NATO standards. The incumbent Chief of the General Staff is Lieutenant General Arben Kingji.

== History ==
The position was formed on 4 May 1913 under the auspices of the Provisional Government of Albania. In January 1920, after the establishment of the government in the Lushnjë Congress, the staff structure was restored and was headed by Lieutenant Colonel Ali Shefqet Shkupi. On 7 April 1939, as a result of the Italian invasion of Albania, the Albanian Armed Forces General Staff ceased to exist. In July 1943, the Partisan General Staff of the Albanian National Liberation Army was formed in Elbasan County. Although it did not have the traditional structure of a regular army headquarters, it had its own originality and organizational features, consisting of experienced military and non-military commanders.

The organization of the General Staff of the Albanian People's Army (Albanian: Shtabi i Përgjithshëm i Ushtrisë Popullore) began on 1 July 1945, after the Ministry of War and National Defense was established. The General Staff was subordinate to the Supreme Commander-in-Chief, whose powers were held by the First Secretary of the Party of Labour of Albania. Since 1 October 1946, some sections were abolished while new sections and departments were created. In 1956, the General Staff was transformed into an institution of uniformity, significantly enhancing the command and staff command capabilities of all ranks and the level of training and combat readiness of the troops. During the 1966 reorganization of the UPS, the General Staff was reorganized as a body that coordinates the activity of the ministry apparatus. The 1966 structure would not change until the 1980s. the powers of Commander-in-chief were held by the First Secretary of the Party of Labour of Albania. In 1974, due to the reorganization of the UPS, the General Staff had no substantial changes in the structure and tasks it performed.

== Mission ==
The development, management and coordination within its land, sea and air components of a joint military force. They are able to fulfill the constitutional mission of safeguarding the independence, sovereignty and territorial integrity of the country, supporting and protecting the civilians in time of peace, crisis and war, contributing for the peace and security in the region and beyond, and supporting or engaging in the process of Euro-Atlantic integration and cooperation and other regional initiatives in the field of security.

== See also ==
- Chief of the General Staff (Albania)
