= Training and Doctrine Command (Albania) =

Training and Doctrine Command of Albania
- Komanda e Doktrinës dhe Stërvitjes
- Coat of Arms of the TRADOC
- Active: 2001 – present
- Country: Albania
- Branch: Albanian Armed Forces
- Type: Army Command
- Role: Recruit, train, and educate
- Garrison/HQ: Tirana
- Nickname: KDS / TRADOC
- Anniversaries: 5 September
- Website: Official website

Commanders
- Notable commanders: Brigadier General Bajram Begaj

Insignia
- Ceremonial flag of TRADOC

- Patch insignia of TRADOC

- Speciality badge of TRADOC

The Albanian Training and Doctrine Command (TRADOC) (Albanian: Komanda e Doktrinës dhe Stërvitjes, KDS) is a research-oriented formation in the Albanian Armed Forces. It is headquartered at Tirana, Albania. TRADOC is charged with overseeing training evaluation and reforms; weapon, equipment and force modernization; development of concepts and doctrine revision.

TRADOC was established on 5 September 2001.

== Mission ==
The TRADOC performs the management and monitoring of the Standardization Agreement (STANAG) processes of the Land Force, Navy and Air Force, which is the main instrument through which Albanian Armed Forces (AAF) can be integrated and modernized according to the criteria of the North Atlantic Treaty Organization (NATO) alliance. Also, an integral part of the work of the TRADOC institution is the monitoring of the academic achievement issued in the Armed Forces; education and training of Sub-officers at all levels of the AAF and of the middle-class civil defense staff, unified with the Sub-officers functions and to develop their career into the Armed Forces; development, coordination, and provision of individual training management capabilities throughout the career cycle, as well as the certification of skills training to all members of the AAF; preparation of staff at all levels to achieve through constructive simulation, providing premises and polygonal capacity for collective preparation of all types of troops through realistic exercises on the ground and operational evaluation of staff, units and subunits; support Ministry of Defence, Albanian Armed Forces and their subordinate structures with information on books, doctrines, manuals, regulations, periodicals, promotional materials, as well as in electronic form; implementation of program policies and procedures of education, training and testing in foreign languages of the personnel; education and training of officer candidates running for commanding departments or sub-units; education and qualification of staff officers and senior commanders, military and civilian, of the AAF and other security institutions as well as advanced security and defense studies through institutional courses, such as, Advanced Officer Course (KAO), Basic Course of Staff Officer (KBOSH), Course of the General Staff Officer (KOSHP), Senior Officer Course (KLO), Advanced Course of Defense and Security (KLSM).

== Structure ==
The Training and Doctrine Command consists on:

- Training and Doctrine Command, in Tirana
  - Armed Forces Academy, in Tirana
  - NCOs Academy, in Tirana
  - Troops School, in Vlorë
  - Simulation Center, in Tirana
  - Doctrine and Research Center, in Tirana

== Courses patches and insignia ==
Patches, badges and shoulder sleeve insignia of the institutional courses wearing by Albanian military officers on their uniforms:

Patch	Qualification Course	Acronym
	Advanced Officer Course; Kursi i Avancuar i Oficerit	KAO
	Basic Course of Staff Officer; Kursi Bazë i Oficerit të Shtabit	KBOSH
	Course of the General Staff Officer; Kursi i Oficerit të Shtabit të Përgjithshëm	KOSHP
	Senior Officer Course; Kursi i Lartë i Oficerit	KLO
	Advanced Course of Defense and Security; Kursi i Lartë i Sigurisë dhe Mbrojtjes	KLSM

== See also ==
- Albanian Armed Forces
- Albanian Land Force
- Albanian Naval Force
- Albanian Air Force
