= Albanian Armed Forces =

Combined military forces of Albania

- Forcat e Armatosura Shqiptare
- Coat of arms of the Albanian Armed Forces

- Flag of the Albanian Armed Forces
- Founded: 4 December 1912; 113 years ago
- Service branches: Albanian Land Force; Albanian Air Force; Albanian Naval Force; Support Command
- Headquarters: Tirana, Albania
- Website: www.mod.gov.al

Leadership
- President: Bajram Begaj
- Minister of Defense: Ermal Nufi
- Chief of the General Staff: Lieutenant general Arben Kingji

Personnel
- Military age: 18
- Conscription: Repealed
- Active personnel: 7,500 as of 2024
- Reserve personnel: 2,100 as of 2025
- Deployed personnel: Iraq; Bosnia and Herzegovina; Bulgaria; Kosovo; Latvia; South Sudan; Egypt (Sinai); Sudan (Abyei); Germany (NSATU-Wiesbaden); Greece (naval); Turkey (naval); Bahrain (naval) formerly: Georgia; Afghanistan; Liberia; Ivory Coast; Chad; Mali; North Macedonia (SEEBrig); Romania (SEEBrig)

Expenditure
- Budget: $867 million (2026 estimate; 2.6% of GDP)
- Percent of GDP: 2.6% (2026)

Industry
- Domestic suppliers: KAYO; Mechanical Combine in Poliçan; Timak Defence Mechanical Plant in Gramsh; Explosive Materials Plant in Mjekës; MEICO
- Foreign suppliers: Austria; Belgium; European Union; Germany; Turkey; United States; United Kingdom

Related articles
- History: Royal Albanian Army (1928–1939); Albanian People's Army (1945–1991)
- Ranks: Military ranks of Albania

The Albanian Armed Forces (Albanian: Forcat e Armatosura të Republikës së Shqipërisë (FARSH)) are the military of Albania and were formed after the declaration of independence in 1912. They consist of the General Staff, the Albanian Land Force, Albanian Air Force and the Albanian Naval Force.

The President of Albania is the Commander-in-Chief of the nation's military. In times of peace, the President's powers as Commander-in-Chief are executed through the Prime Minister and the Defence Minister.

== Missions and duties ==
According to the Albanian Constitution, the Albanian Armed Forces are charged to: protect the territorial integrity of the country, be present in areas incurring menace, assist the population in case of natural and industrial disasters, warn the dangers of military and non-military nature, protect the constitutional order as it is determined by law and participate in international operations in composition of multinational forces.

== History ==
On 4 December 1912, the Albanian Prime Minister, Ismail Qemali and his government, formed the Albanian National Army. Its first Chief in Command was Lieutenant Colonel Ali Shefqet Shkupi By 1923, the Albanian Armed Forces fielded 10,691 active troops, including military police forces. At that time, Albania did not have a navy.

In 1927, the Albanian Armed Forces numbered approximately 8,000. These troops were organised into three groups, based in Tirana, Shkodër to the north and Berat to the south. Each group was organised into three battalions of 500. A guards battalion of 350 was organized in Tirana. Four frontier battalions of mountaineers were held on reserve, as well as tanks and armoured cars. Additionally, a cadet school, a machine-gun school, and a bombing school were housed in the capital. Italian involvement in the Albanian Armed Forces was significant, with an Italian Colonel attached to each of the three main troop groups and an Italian officer attached to each battalion and battery and to each medical, veterinary, and transportation unit. In 1927 alone, the Albanian military ordered 20,000 rifles, 40 mountain guns, 120 machine guns, and other supplies from Italy.

=== Royal Albanian Army ===
The Royal Albanian Army (Albanian: Ushtria Mbretërore Shqiptare) was the army of King Zogu from 1928 until 1939. Its commander-in-chief was himself; its commander General Xhemal Aranitasi; its chief of staff was General Gustav von Myrdacz. The army was mainly financed by Italy. On 7 April 1939, Italian troops invaded the country, and captured it in six days after weak resistance by the overwhelmed Albanian army.

=== Cold War ===
After the Second World War, Albania became a Soviet-aligned country. The ranks and structure of the Albanian Armed Forces were organised based on Soviet concepts, thus increasing the political control of the State-Party over the Armed Forces. One of the defining characteristics of civilian-military relations during this period was the effort of the civilian leadership to ensure the loyalty of the military to the communist system's values and institutions.

Like all other branches of the state, the military was subjugated to Communist Party control. All high-ranking military officers and most of the lower and middle ranks were members of the Communist Party—and had loyalties to it. The system was re-enforced by the establishment of Party cells within the military and extensive communist political education alongside soldiers' military training, by the political commissars. To further increase its political control, the Albanian Communist Party enlarged the conscription system, thus enlisting in the Armed Forces personnel dedicated to the military career from the Albanian rural areas.

The State and Party went even further, beginning on 1 May 1966, military ranks were abolished following the example of the Chinese People's Liberation Army, heavily influenced by Maoism during the years of the Cultural Revolution, and thus adopting strategic concepts related to forms of guerrilla war (Vietnam War doctrine). The military was still organised during this period into basic structural forms, but the role of the military commander was insignificant with respect to the commanding role of the political commissars. In 1991 the rank system was reestablished under President Ramiz Alia.

During all these years, Sigurimi which was the Albanian secret service during the period and was formed upon the KGB structure, was responsible for the execution, imprisonment, and deportation of more than 600 officers from the Armed Forces, by completely neutralising the Armed Forces ability to start a coup d'état. Initially the communist purge concentrated on military personnel who had graduated from the Western Military Academies (mainly from Italy 1927–1939), and was extended later to the officers graduated from the Soviet Union (after Albania abandoned the Warsaw Pact in 1968). As the communist regime collapsed in Albania during 1990, there was a real fear that the armed forces might intervene to halt the collapse of communism by force. In the event, the armed forces stood by as the regime of which they had been a part disintegrated.

During the 1980s, Albania had reduced the number of infantry brigades from eight to four. It had shifted to fully manned units from its prior reliance on the mobilisation of reserve soldiers to flesh out a larger number of units manned at a lower level. Each brigade had three infantry battalions and one lightly equipped artillery battalion. Armoured forces consisted of one tank brigade. Artillery forces were increased from one to three regiments during the 1980s, and six battalions of coastal artillery were maintained at strategic points along the Adriatic Sea littoral.

=== Post 1991 ===
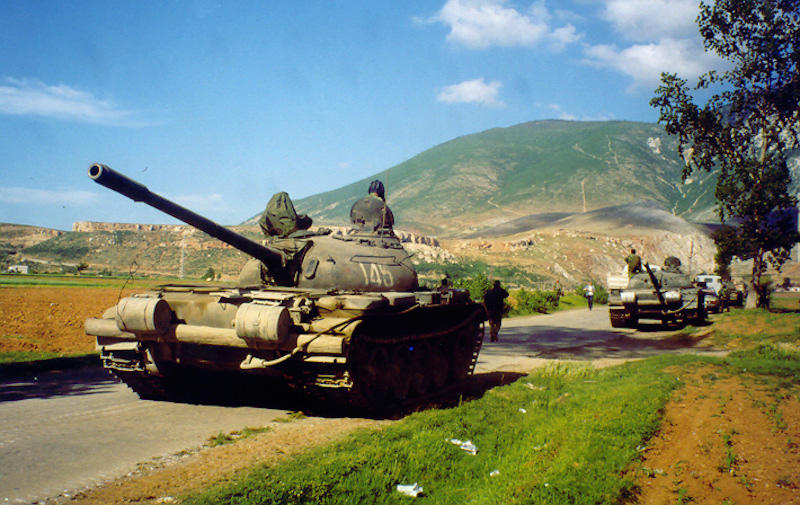
An Albanian Type 59 tank during the Albania-Yugoslav border incident in May 1999

In 1992, the Library of Congress estimated that the ground forces had about 35,000 men, or about three-quarters of all armed forces personnel. Because the strength of the ground forces was sufficient to man only about two divisions, brigades of approximately 3,000 soldiers became the largest army formation. In 1991 four infantry brigades constituted the bulk of combat units in the ground forces.

During the civilian riots in 1997, the political attempts by the government to use the Armed Forces to crush the rebellion were soon demonstrated to be a failure, following a total disintegration of the Armed Forces and the looting of the military facilities by the civilian population.

Albania sheltered many thousands of Kosovar refugees during the 1999 conflict, and allowed NATO to provide logistical assistance for Kosovo Force (KFOR) troops through Communications Zone West headquartered in Durrës. Albania was part of the International Stabilization Force (SFOR) serving in Bosnia (then EU mission ALTHEA), and Albanian peacekeepers are part of the International Security Assistance Force in Afghanistan, ISAF and the international stabilization force in Iraq. Albania has been a steadfast supporter of U.S. policy in Iraq, and one of only four nations to contribute troops to the combat phase of Operation Enduring Freedom. Increasing the military budget was one of the most important conditions for NATO integration. Military spending has generally been lower than 1.5% since 1996 only to peak in 2009 at 2% and fall again to 1.5%.

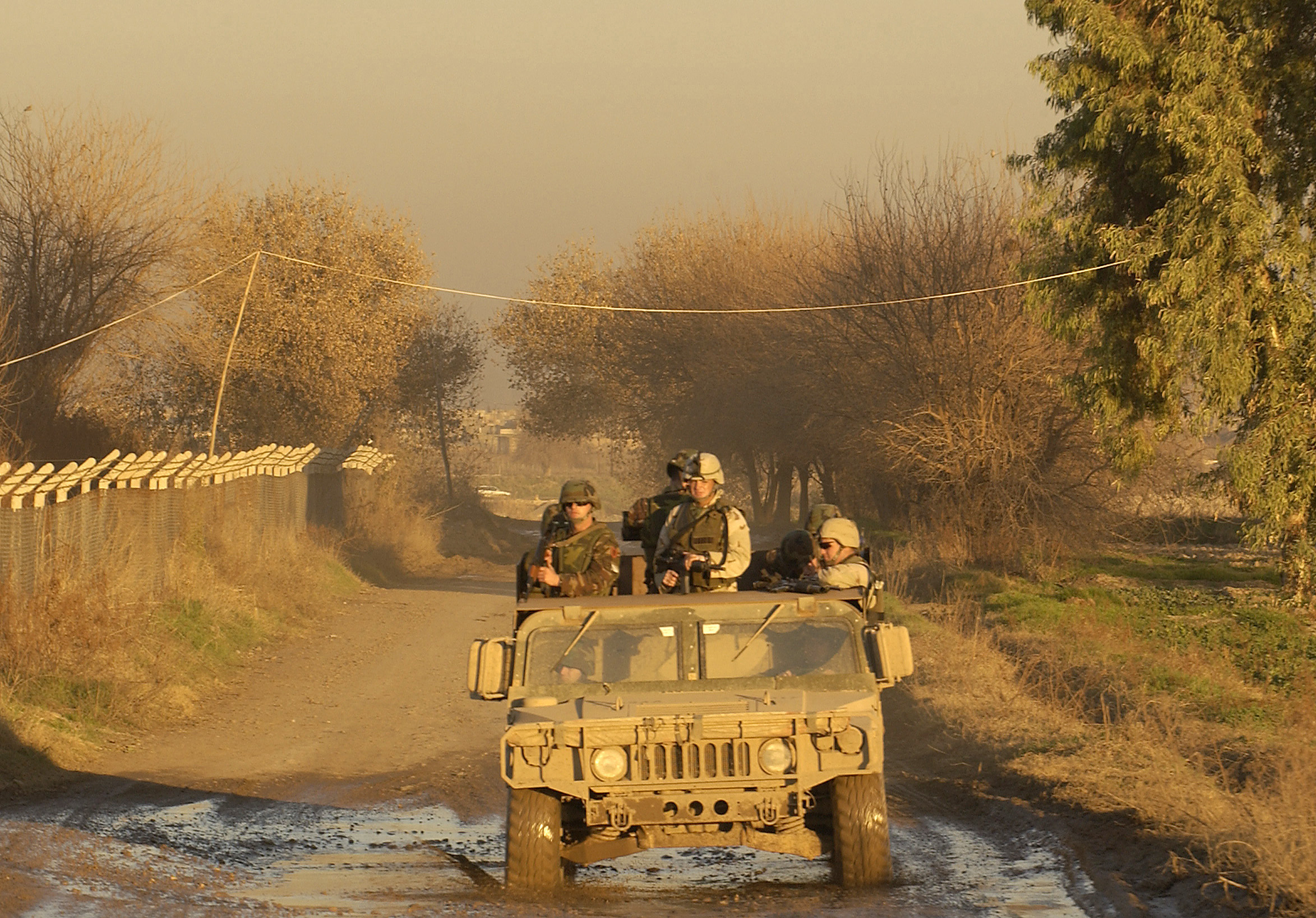
Albanian soldiers conduct a joint patrol with U.S. soldiers in Iraq on 13 January 2005

There was an incident in 2002 in Albania where it was discovered, in a cluster of mountain bunkers, 16 tons of primitive, undocumented chemical weapon agents that Albania had forgotten about.

In December 2006, the Armed Forces adopted a new structure based on the Joint warfare concept. It had three main Commands: the Joint Forces Command, the Joint Support Command and the Training and Doctrine Command. The Albanian Joint Forces Command (AJFC) consists of the Rapid Reaction Brigade, the Commando Regiment, the Navy Brigade, the Air Brigade and the Area Support Brigade. The Albanian Joint Support Command provides support and logistical functions to all AAF units. The Albanian Training and Doctrine Command was established as the main educational and training provider for the Albanian Armed Forces. The final number of personnel will be 13,800 (including 2,000 civilians). However this new structure lasted a little more than 3 years and in April 2010 returned to its classic and current form.

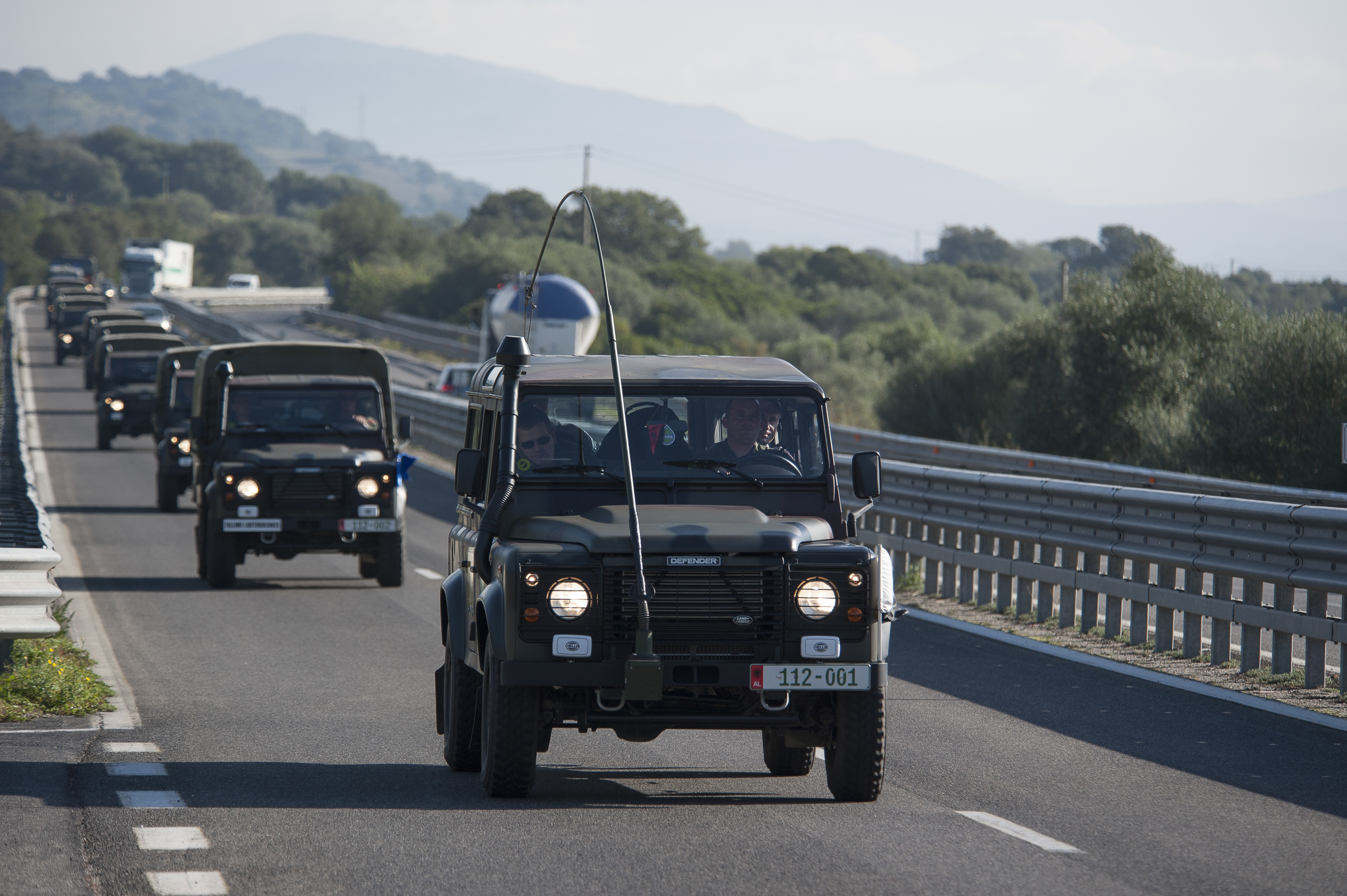
Convoy transfer of the Albanian Army

In March 2008 the problem of massive amounts of excess ammunition stockpiled in Albania became known to the public through the tragic consequences of the explosion of an ammunition depot (the 2008 Tirana explosions).

The Albanian Land Force or Albanian Army consists of the Rapid Reaction Brigade, a Commando Regiment, and the Area Support Brigade. Part of the structure of the Albanian Commando Regiment is the Special Operations Battalion (BOS). The Albanian Army is mostly supported by the United States, Germany, the Netherlands, Italy, the United Kingdom, Greece, Turkey, Switzerland, Denmark and Belgium.

The Albanian Navy performs mainly Coast Guard duties, and recently the Albanian parliament has approved some amendments to the articles of the actual Law on the Coast Guard in Albania, in order to improve the necessary legal framework due to efforts at European Union-NATO integration. Since February 2008, Albania participates officially in NATO's Operation Active Endeavor in the Mediterranean. Albania became a full member of the North Atlantic Treaty Organization on 1 April 2009. It hosts an international fair on security and defense called the Albanian Military Exhibition (ALMEX) where different security industries can present their products and services for the regional market.

=== Modernisation ===
Albanian flag patch worn on Army uniforms

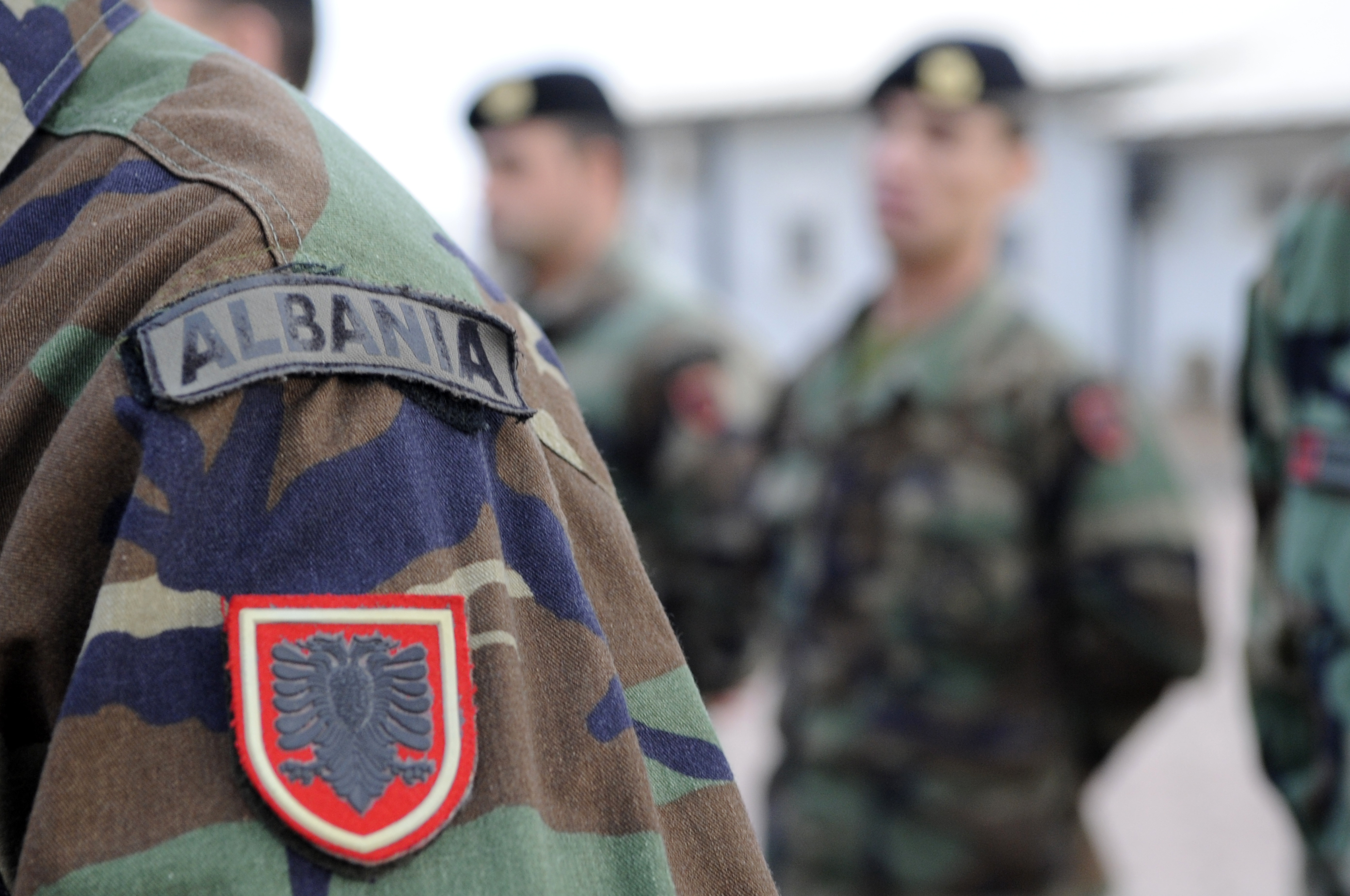
Albanian Army badges

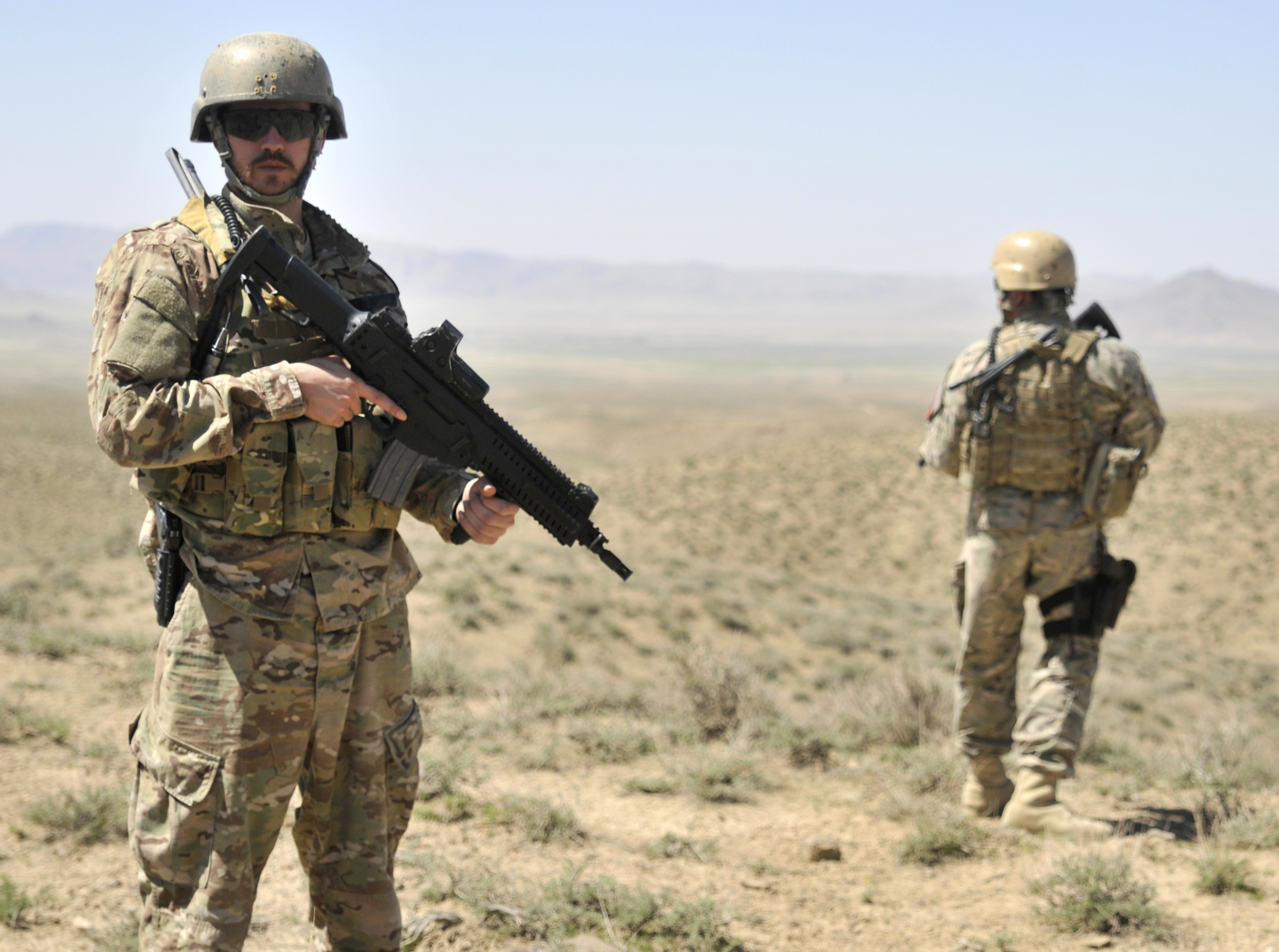
Albanian special forces soldier in Afghanistan, 2013

After several major re-equipment programs, in 2001 the Albanian Armed Forces launched a 10-year reform program to become technologically advanced and fully professional by 2011. The new armed forces consists of about 14,500 troops including 2,000 civilians, trained to NATO standards. The same radical reform is being implemented on surplus equipment, including airplanes, tanks, helicopters, artillery equipment, navy vessels, SALW and ammunition. Albania started an ambitious destruction program. However, Albania is still dealing with a huge amount of surplus and obsolete ammunition, a direct result of the country's long isolation and ethnic tensions in the area. The Albanian Ministry of Defense estimates such quantity up to 85,000 tons, but it is expected to increase up to 104,000 tons due to the ongoing downsizing process of the AAF.

In 2004 U.S. President George W. Bush authorised the use of Nunn-Lugar Cooperative Threat Reduction program funds for projects in Albania, marking the first time such funds were reauthorised for use outside the former Soviet Union. With this funding the U.S. assisted the Government of Albania with the destruction of a stockpile of chemical warfare agents left over from the communist regime (Category 1, Total amount 16.7 tons). The final cost of the project was US$48 million and was officially completed on 10 July 2007.

On 3 April 2006, the final contract for the delivery of 12 Bölkow-Blom MBB BO-105 lightweight twin-engine multi-role helicopters to the Republic of Albania was signed in Tirana between the Albanian Ministry of Defence and Eurocopter Deutschland GmbH. According to the Albanian Government, six of the BO-105 helicopters are designated for the Albanian Air Brigade, four for the Ministry of Interior and the remaining two for the Albanian Ministry of Health.

Albania has recently acquired four Eurocopter AS532 Cougar helicopters and has two more EC145 on order as of 2015. Also, since 2008 four Damen Stan 4207 patrol vessels have been commissioned in the Navy, three of them have been constructed in Albania.

On 16 July 2014, the Albanian defence minister declared that within 2014 the Albanian Motorised Infantry Battalion will be fully combat ready and also equipped with modern NATO equipment. This will be the first unit in the Albanian Armed Forces to not have the AK-47 in its inventory. Instead the M4 carbine will act as its standard battle rifle.

In August 2018, the Prime Minister of Albania, Edi Rama, announced via Facebook that NATO would be investing in the base, saying "NATO will invest more than 50 million euros ($58 million) for the first phase of the project alone, to modernise the Kuçovë Air Base."

The process of modernization of the Albanian Armed Forces is based on the short-term, middle-term and long-term objectives and priorities of their restructuring and development aiming at achieving the increase of the operational capacities. The modernization programme started before the country's North Atlantic Treaty Organization membership (on 1 April 2009) with the purchase of armaments produced by the NATO countries. It also started a programme for the disposal and alienation of surplus ammunition inherited from the communist regime for 50 years.

==== Ground Forces ====
The modernization of the Land Forces began around 2006, starting with Special Forces such as the BFS (then known as the Batalioni i Operacioneve Speciale, BOS) and the Commandos. Seeing their involvement in NATO peacekeeping operations in Iraq and Afghanistan, the need arose for more modern armaments given that until then these branches used old Soviet or Chinese era armaments. In 2007, the Ministry of Defense (MOD) reached agreement with the German company Heckler & Koch for the purchase of several weapons in limited quantities for special forces, including HK416, two variants of H&K G36, HK417, MP7, and variants of H&K USP. Some of them were only for evaluation purposes. In 2009 the Beretta ARX160 was issued in much larger quantities, thus becoming the standard assault rifle for the BFS over the HK416 and HK G-36. In 2015, the Colt M4A1 joined the ARX160 in standard use. For the 3 infantry battalions, the modernization started in 2013, initially introducing the as standard handgun the Beretta Px4, as a light machine gun H&K MG4 and H&K MG5 as a General-purpose machine gun.

In 2015 other weapons were introduced over all ground units. The 2nd Infantry Battalion (B2K) was equipped with Colt M4A1s. The Military Police was equipped with the Beretta ARX160 and added 4 new Iveco LMV vehicles. The Sako TRG-22 and TGR-44 were distributed to all sniper units, while the Benelli M4 Super 90 to the BFS and MP for close-quarters combat.

The following year the Italian Government offered an aid package of 5,000 Beretta AR70/90 units, which at the time were in the process of being withdrawn and replaced in favor of the Beretta ARX160 of the Italian Army. This package fitted the needs of the Albanian Armed Forces (AAF) as the process of replacing the old Soviet 7.62×39mm ammunition with 5.56×45mm, a task-requirement by Standardization Agreement (STANAG) of NATO allies since Albania's accession in 2009. The process that was expected to last within 10 years, but the aid package helped complete the process 4 years earlier without additional costs. After the process of replacing the AK-47 variants (many of which were locally produced under the name ASh-78 and ASh-82) with the AR70/90 ended, the rifle became the standard weapon and most used in most Land Forces branches.

In 2017 the Combat Support Battalion (Batalioni Mbështetjes së Luftimit, BML) was equipped with Hirtenberger M6 60mm and Hirtenberger M8 81mm mortars by the Austrian company Hirtenberger Defense Systems, thus removing from use the Chinese-made mortars from the communist period. In March of the same year came the first 77 HMMWV M1114 of an aid package totaling 250 armored vehicles. They were obtained from Excess Defense Articles (EDA) through the Defense Security Cooperation Agency, a United States program to support NATO partners and allies. The vehicles were immediately put at the service of B1K. In 2019 came the second part of the package of 250 vehicles, consisting of 36 International MaxxPro and 1 MaxxPro Wrecker recovery vehicle. These vehicles joined the previous 3 MaxxPro bringing the total number of MRAPs used by Special Forces to 40. Following the 2024-2033 Armed Forces Long Term Development Plan, structural changes were made. Namely, the 1st and 3rd Infantry Battalions were increased to regiment size and renamed to Northern and Southern Infantry Regiment respectively. The Special Forces Battalion and the Commando Battalion are merged under same command named Special Operations Regiment. Combat Support Battalion was also transformed into the Combat Support Regiment with plans to equip it with 105mm and 155mm howitzer for an artillery battalion on its component. The Infantry Regiments and Special Operations Regiment will be equipped with C-UAS, V-ShoRAD and M-RAD capabilities. The Northern and Southern Infantry Regiments will each have a maneuver company equipped with IFVs.

==== Naval Forces ====
In 2007, contracts were signed with the Damen Group for equipping the Albanian Naval Forces with patrol vessels to be used to perform a number of tasks and duties, including coastal patrols, search and rescue, control and monitoring of maritime traffic, and marine environment protection. The contract envisaged the construction of 4 vessels of the Damen Stan 4207 class, with the first of them being built in the Netherlands and 3 others at the Pasha Liman naval base in Albania. The first patrol vessel, named Iliria P-132, was built and delivered to the Albanian Coast Guard in August 2008, enabling the following construction of 3 other patrol vessels in Pasha Liman Base by Albanian carpenters assisted by the experts of Damen Group. The second patrol vessel, Oriku P-133, was commissioned in September 2011, the third ship, Lisus P-133, became operational in 2012 and the fourth, Butrint P-134, in 2013.

=== Cyber Security Unit ===
In January 2024, the Military Cyber Security Unit was created, as a special structure of the General Staff of the Armed Forces. The Unit was made operational with support from the United States.

== Organization ==
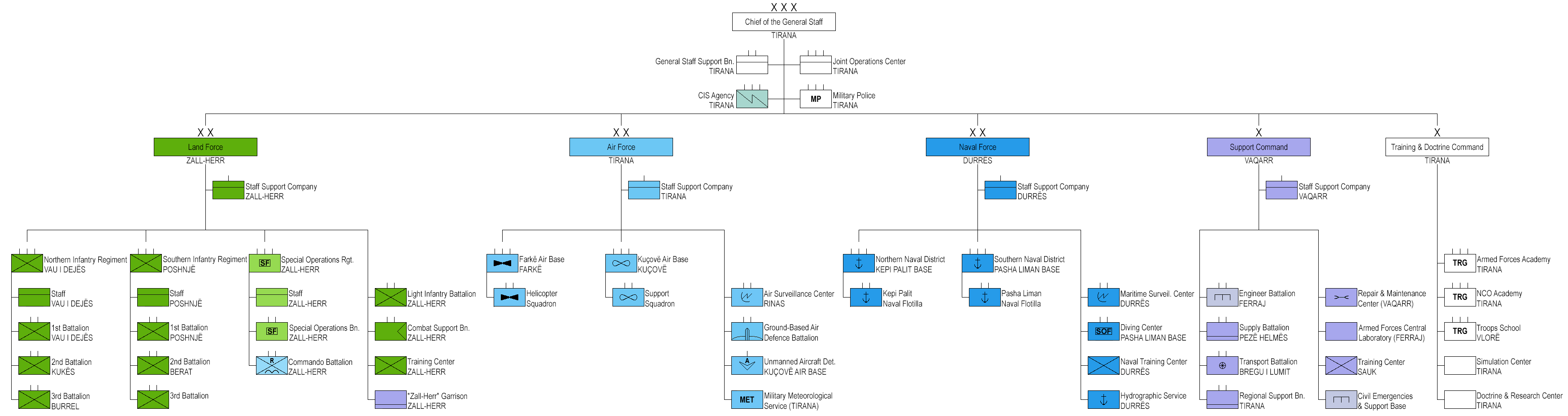
Albanian Armed Forces organization as of November 2025

== Participation ==
The Albanian Armed Forces are engaged in different missions at home and abroad due to the political commitments of the Republic of Albania in the framework of NATO, UNO, EU and coalitions against terrorism since September the 9-th 1996, starting from the first mission in Bosnia-Herzegovina. The number of AAF troop participants in peacekeeping (PK) missions has increased, as well as the geographical field where these missions are conducted.

Contributions to military operations by the Republic of Albania led by NATO, UNO, EU, from 1996 - December 2024 total 8,998 military personnel.

Country	Current Mission	Organization	No. of personnel
Gaza Strip	ISF	United Nations	40
Germany	NSATU	NATO	3
Egypt	MFO	United Nations	3
Bulgaria	eVA	NATO	120
(Bosnia and Herzegovina) Bosnia	Operation Althea	European Union	30
United Kingdom	Operation Interflex	NATO	Unknown
South Sudan	UNMISS	United Nations	10 in total
Aegean Sea	Operation Sea Guardian	NATO	ALS Oriku Iliria-class patrol boat manned by 21 crew members
Kosovo	KFOR	NATO	267 personnel, 1 helicopter, other vehicles unspecified
Latvia	eFP	NATO	20

Country	Former Mission	Organization	No. of personnel
Afghanistan	Resolute Support Mission	NATO	4160 in total
Mali	EUTM Mali	European Union	34 in total
Afghanistan	ISAF	NATO	3,041 in total.
(Georgia (country)) Georgia	UNIMOG	United Nations	39
Chad	MINURCAT	European Union	three contingents consisting of 63 military members (189 in total)
Iraq	Operation Iraqi Freedom	United States Department of Defense	1,345 in total
Iraq	NTM-I	NATO	1 officer and 1 NCO
Iraq	NATO Mission Iraq Rotations 2022-2023	NATO	1-2 personnel per Rotation
