= List of equipment of the Albanian Armed Forces =

The equipment currently used by the Albanian Armed Forces includes small arms, combat vehicles, aircraft, watercraft, artillery and transport vehicles. Its main mission is the defense of the independence, sovereignty and territorial integrity of the Republic of Albania, participation in humanitarian, combat, non-combat and peace support operations. After the integration of the Albania in North Atlantic Treaty Organization (NATO) was start implementing a defence modernisation programme which consist on the demolition of the surplus armament inherited from the communist regime and its replacement with modern weapons of NATO standards.

== Future equipment ==
The Albanian Armed Forces are continuing their modernization program with plans to acquire new systems and platforms to enhance combat capability, interoperability with NATO forces, and rapid mobility. These acquisitions focus on replacing obsolete systems with modern, NATO-standard equipment.

Planned or proposed future acquisitions include:

- Infantry Fighting Vehicles (IFVs): Albania has shown interest in acquiring modern IFVs to replace aging BTR-60 vehicles. Possible candidates include the Boxer, Patria AMV, and Piranha V.
- Anti-tank missile systems: The introduction of advanced anti-tank guided missiles (ATGMs) such as the BGM-71 TOW and possibly the FGM-148 Javelin is under consideration.
- Air defense systems: Plans include the modernization of short-range air defense capabilities through new MANPADS and mobile radar systems to replace legacy Strela-2 units.
- Utility helicopters: The armed forces are exploring options for acquiring new light utility helicopters to improve transport, reconnaissance, and medevac capabilities.
- Unmanned aerial systems (UAS): Investment in tactical drones for surveillance and reconnaissance is expected to enhance situational awareness and border monitoring.
- Naval assets: The modernization of Albania's naval fleet is ongoing, with interest in new patrol boats and coastal surveillance systems to protect maritime borders.

These modernization efforts aim to increase Albania's contribution to NATO missions, improve national defense, and ensure a rapid response capability in various operational scenarios.

== Modernisation program ==
The process of modernization of the AAF is based on the short-term, middle-term and long-term objectives and priorities of their restructuring and development aiming at achieving the increase of the operational capacities. The modernization programme started before the country's North Atlantic Treaty Organization membership (on 1 April 2009) with the purchase of armaments produced by the NATO countries. It also started a programme for the disposal and alienation of surplus ammunition inherited from the communist regime for 50 years.

Ground Forces
The modernization of the Land Forces began around 2006, starting with Special Forces such as the BFS (then known as the Batalioni i Operacioneve Speciale, BOS) and the Commandos. Seeing their involvement in NATO peacekeeping operations in Iraq and Afghanistan, the need arose for more modern armaments given that until then these branches used old Soviet or Chinese era armaments. In 2007, the Ministry of Defense (MOD) reached agreement with the German company Heckler & Koch for the purchase of several weapons in limited quantities for special forces, including HK416, two variants of H&K G36, HK417, MP7, and variants of H&K USP. Some of them were only for evaluation purposes. In 2009 the Beretta ARX160 was issued in much larger quantities thus becoming the standard assault rifle for the BFS over the HK416 and HK G-36. In 2015, the Colt M4A1 joined ARX160 as standard use alongside it. For the 3 infantry battalions, the modernization started in 2013, initially introducing the as standard handgun the Beretta Px4, as a light machine gun H&K MG4 and H&K MG5 as a General-purpose machine gun.
In 2015 other weapons were introduced over all ground units. The 2nd Infantry Battalion (B2K) was equipped with Colt M4A1. The Military Police was equipped with the Beretta ARX160 and added 4 new Iveco LMV vehicles. The Sako TRG-22 and TGR-44 were distributed to all sniper units, while the Benelli M4 Super 90 to the BFS and MP for Close-quarters combat.
The following year the Italian Government offered an aid package of 5,000 Beretta AR70/90 units, which at the time were in the process of being withdrawn and replaced in favor of the Beretta ARX160 over Italian Army. This package fitted the needs of the Albanian Armed Forces (AAF) as the process of replacing the old Soviet 7.62×39mm ammunition with 5.56×45mm, a task-requirement by Standardization Agreement (STANAG) of NATO allies since Albania's accession in 2009. The process that was expected to last within 10 years, but the aid package helped completing the process 4 years earlier and without additional costs. After the process of replacing the AK47 variants (many of which were locally produced under the name ASh-78 and ASh-82) with the AR70/90 was ended, the rifle became the standard weapon and most used over most Land Forces branches.
In 2017 the Combat Support Battalion (Batalioni Mbështetjes së Luftimit, BML) was equipped with Hirtenberger M6 60mm and Hirtenberger M8 81mm mortars by the Austrian company Hirtenberger Defense Systems. Thus removing from use the Chinese made mortars from the communist period. In March of the same year came the first 77 HMMWV M1114 of an aid package totaling 250 armored vehicles. They are obtained from Excess Defense Articles (EDA) through the Defense Security Cooperation Agency, a United States program to support NATO partners and allies. The vehicles were immediately put at the service of B1K. In 2019 came the second part of the package of 250 vehicles and it consisted of 36 International MaxxPro and 1 MaxxPro Wrecker recovery vehicle. These vehicles joined the previous 3 MaxxPro bringing the total number of MRAPs used by Special Forces to 40.

Naval Forces
In 2007, was signed a contracts with the Damen Group for the or completing of the Albanian Naval Forces with patrol vessels to be used to perform a number of tasks and duties, including coastal patrols, search and rescue, control and monitoring of maritime traffic, marine environment protection. The contract envisaged the construction of 4 vessels of the Damen Stan 4207 class, which the first of them would be built in Netherlands and 3 others in the Pasha Liman naval base in Albania. The first patrol vessel, named Iliria P-132, was built and delivered to the Albanian Coast Guard in August 2008. Enabling thus the following construction of 3 other patrol vessels in Pasha Liman Base by Albanian carpenters assisted by the experts of Damen Group. The second patrol vessel Oriku P-133 will be commissioned in September 2011, the third ship, Lisus P-133, will be operational in 2012 and fourth Butrint P-134 in 2013.

Air Force And Air Defense
In February 2025, Albania Portugal joined the European Sky Shield Initiative. A NATO project to build an integrated European air defence system, Albania's defence minister Pirro Vengu said. Albania signed a Memorandum of Understanding (MoU) for the further development of the ESSI, thus joining the German initiative, which aims to strengthen Europe's air and missile defense through joint equipment and systems, Vengu said in a Facebook post on Friday. The ESSI is an Initiative that provides for the purchase of anti-aircraft defense systems, in the case of medium-range defenses, the choice falls on the IRIS-T system.

== Individual Equipment ==
Model	Type	Origin	Image	Details
Helmets
Ops Core FAST	Combat Helmet	United States		Used by the Special Forces Personnel
Gefechtshelm M92	Combat Helmet	Germany		Used By Infantry.
Camouflage
M12 Woodland	Camouflage Pattern	Albania		Standard Camouflage Pattern of the Armed Forces, widely used among various branches on Uniforms, Helmets and Ballistic Protection Vests.
Multicam	Camouflage Pattern	United States		Crye-based Multicam used by Albanian special forces personnel.
Night Vision
AN/PSV-18 (MNVD)	Night Vision	United States		
AN/PSV-15 (NVB)	Night Vision	United States		
Bomb suits
MED-ENG EOD 9	Bomb suit	Canada		

== Weapons ==
Weapon	Caliber / Type	Origin	Image	Details
Pistols
Beretta Px4	9×19mm	Italy		Standard service handgun of Albanian Land Force. Since 2013 has started the replacement of TT-33, PM eventually, the M9.
Beretta APX	9x19mm	Italy		In use by the RENEA.
H&K USP P8 H&K USP P12	9×19mm.45 ACP	Germany		Used by BFS, and elsewhere in limited quantities to serve alongside the Beretta Px4.
FN Five-Seven	FN 5.7×28mm	Belgium		Used by BFS
Glock 19	9×19mm	Austria		Used by BFS, and elsewhere in limited quantities to serve alongside the Beretta Px4.
Beretta 92 Yavuz 16	9×19mm	Italy Turkey		In service since the late 90s as service handgun along with TT-33 and PM. Used mostly by General Staff and special forces until the introductions of Px4, Glock 19 and H&K USPs'.
Submachine guns
H&K MP5 MKEK MP5	9×19mm	West Germany Turkey		Entirely replaced the PPS-43 and P-84 SMG (domestic version). Used mostly by BFS, Albanian Commandos and the Military Police. The weapon comes in multiple variants, from the standard MP5, MP5PDW and the suppressed MP5SD, to the more easily concealable MP5K, which are stockless and have vertical foregrips. Some of the MP5s were produced in Turkey under license from MKEK and were donated to AAF in December 2013.
Heckler & Koch MP7	HK 4.6×30mm	Germany		Used In limited quantity by BFS and RENEA
Heckler & Koch UMP-45	.45 ACP	Germany		Used In limited quantity by BFS and RENEA
Battle rifles
Heckler & Koch G3	7.62×51mm NATO	West Germany		Used by peacekeeping forces BFS
SKS	7.62×39mm	People's Socialist Republic of Albania		Used for ceremonial purposes
Assault rifles, and carbines
Colt M4A1	5.56×45mm	United States		Delivered in 2015, with the intention that with the AR70/90, it will replace the AK-47 within the next 5 years. Common accessories included the AN/PEQ-2, ACOG or EOTech optics, also the grenade launcher M203 can be mounted. Used as service rifle by 2nd Infantry Battalion (B2K), whereas the BFS, until now has only used it in training.
Beretta AR70/90	5.56×45mm	Italy		The Italian government decided to donate about 5000 AR70/90 at the end of 2016. Although not one of the most modern weapons in circulation it will serve in fulfillment of one of the objectives set, such as the transition from 7.62×39mm to the 5.56×45mm to be used by all NATO allies. It is the AAF standard primary weapon since 2017 and alongside M4 have totally replaced the AK47 and its variants.
Beretta ARX160	5.56×45mm	Italy		Since 2010, initially the Beretta ARX160 version has been used by BFS in their missions in Iraq and Afghanistan, serving as well as evaluation purpose. Currently the weapon is in use by Special Forces, Military Police and Engineer Battalion.
AK-47 Type 56 ASh-78	7.62×39mm	Soviet Union People's Republic of China People's Socialist Republic of Albania		Since 2013 being phased out in favour of the Beretta AR70/90 and Colt M4A1. Limited use seen in troops school Bunavi and by Commando Battalion.
ASh-82	7.62×39mm	People's Socialist Republic of Albania	A	Copy of AKMS, locally manufactured under license since 1982 by UM Gramsh. There have also been modifications and modernization of heavily modified ASH-82 with SOPMOD accessories, mainly used by BFS, Commandos and Police Special Forces, such as RENEA and Republican Guard special unit and so on.
Heckler & Koch G36	5.56×45mm NATO	Germany		Used by the BFS
Heckler & Koch HK416A7	5.56×45mm NATO	Germany		Used by the BFS
MPT-76	7.62×51mm NATO	Turkey		30 MPT-76s
MPT-55	5.56×45mm NATO	Turkey		30 MPT-55s
Shotguns
Benelli M4 Super 90	12-gauge	Italy		Used by BFS and Military Police.
Sniper rifles
Sako TRG-22 Sako TRG-42	7.62×51mm.300 Winchester Magnum.338 Lapua Magnum	Finland		Standard sniper rifle.
Designated marksman rifles
H&K HK417	7.62×51mm	Germany		The primary designated marksman rifle. It is equipped with an S&B PMII Ultra Short optical sight for long-range engagements. Limited quantity, used by BFS.
Heckler & Koch SR9	7.62×51mm NATO	Germany		Hunting/target rifle Used by the BFS
Heckler & Koch PSG1	7.62×51mm NATO	Germany		Used by the BFS
Dragunov SVD	7.62×54mmR	Soviet Union		Replaced by Sako TRG-22 and Sako TRG-42.
Anti materiel rifles
Barrett M82	.50 BMG	United States		The M82 recoil-operated, semi-automatic anti-materiel rifle. Very limited quantity, mostly used by BFS as Long-Range Precision Anti Structure rifle.
Steyr HS .50	.50 BMG	Austria		Limited Numbers used by Military Police Renea And Seen By The Army
Barrett M99	.50 BMG	United States		Anti Material Sniper Used By Albanian Special Forces And Renea
Light Machine Guns
H&K MG4	5.56×45mm	Germany		The MG4 is the standard light support weapon. It features a longer barrel, a bipod and a shoulder strap for greater range and accuracy. Adopted in 2013 with the intention of replacing the RPK within 5 years. Currently used as standard LMG weapon by 2nd Infantry Battalion (B2K) and special forces (BFS and Commandos).
RPD	7.62×39mm	Soviet Union		Replaced by MG4 and MG5 Some units were donated to Kosovo Liberation Army in 1998
RPK ASh-78 Tip-2	7.62×39mm	Soviet Union People's Socialist Republic of Albania		Replaced by MG4 and MG5
General-purpose machine guns
H&K MG5	7.62×51mm	Germany		Standard general-purpose machinegun. Was adopted in the Army in 2013 to serve as infantry support, deployment as a vehicle-mounted support weapon, and perhaps in the near future to be used as a helicopter door-gun.
Rheinmetall MG3	7.62x51mm NATO	Germany		Limited numbers in special forces inevntory
Heavy Machine Guns
DShKM	12.7×108 mm	Albania People's Socialist Republic of Albania		Locally Made from a Chinese copy of the DShK. Used as standard heavy machine gun. It has also been seen mounted on Humvee vehicles. APCs and Tanks. Sometimes even on patrol vessels. Also used for Air Defense.
M2 Browning	12.7×99mm NATO	United States		Mounted on Vehicles and Tripods
Anti Tank Systems
RPG-7 Type 69 RPG Tip-57	40mm	Soviet Union People's Republic of China People's Socialist Republic of Albania		Albania mainly owns the Type 69 rocket launcher, a Chinese copy of the RPG-7. They also have a locally manufactured variant called the "Tip-57." Both are inherited from the communist era and have been kept in storage. In 2022 the MoD published videos on their official YouTube channel where the ground forces were seen using them while training that same year.
AT4	84mm	Sweden United States		Used by the BFS. It replaced the RPG-7. Delivered in 2024.
HJ-8	120mm	China		Semi-Automatic command to line of sight ATGM. It was bought from China in the late 90s in case of a possible attack from Yugoslavia. It was used during the Albanian-Yugoslav border incident
9M14 Malyutka HJ-73	125mm	Soviet Union China		For BMP-1 Vehicles, Chinese variant used by infantry
FGM-148 Javelin	127mm	United States		On 16 May 2022, Lockheed Martin in a press release stated that the company had received orders from several international customers including Norway, Albania, Latvia and Thailand. Approximately more than 280 Launchers and an unknown amount of missiles are on deliveries. The purchase was confirmed a few days later by the Ministry of Defence, Niko Peleshi for yet an undisclosed number and contract value of the system.
BGM-71 TOW	152mm	United States		Seen Used By Infantry And Mounted On HMMWVs and International MaxxPro firing near a mountain
Grenades and grenade launchers
M84 Stun Grenade		United States		
RGD-5		Soviet Union		Hand grenade used by Albanian Land Force since 1970. Being withdrawn from service.
Beretta GLX 160	40×46mm	Italy		Grenade launcher used on Beretta ARX160
M203	40×46mm	United States		Grenade launcher used on Colt M4A1.

== Artillery ==
Type	Model	Origin	Image	No.	Details
Self-propelled howitzer
Self-propelled artillery	ATMOS 2000	Israel		Unknown	
Mortar carriers
120 mm mortar carrier	Elbit SPEAR	Israel		Unknown	
Towed artillery
Air-transportable lightweight towed howitzer	MKE Boran 105 mm howitzer	Turkey		6	The Albanian Armed Forces said that they will be equipped with 105 mm Turkish artillery systems. Ahead of the 2026 NATO summit in Ankara, MKE announced the official purchase of 6 artillery pieces and an unknown number of ammunition.
Multiple rocket launchers
107mm/130mm Multiple Rocket Launcher	Type 63 multiple rocket launcher	China		270	As of 1998
Mortars
60mm Mortar	Hirtenberger M6	Austria		100	It has been introduced in service since 2017. Currently used by the Combat Support Battalion, b1K, b2K and b3K
81mm Mortar	Hirtenberger M8	Austria		80	It has been introduced in service since 2017. Currently used by the Combat Support Battalion
120mm Heavy Mortar	Soltam K6	United States; Israel		550	M120 Variant Supplied by USA

== Air defense ==
Type	Model	Origin	Image	No.	Details
surface-to-air defence systems
Surface-to-air missile	IRIS-T SL	Germany		Unknown	Since Albania joined European Sky Shield Initiative its expected that Albania buys the IRIS-T SL surface-to-air defence systems to strengthenits air defence.
MANPADS
MANPADS	FIM-92 Stinger	United States			Ordered along with FGM-148 Javelin according to MOD.
MANPADS	HN-5	People's Republic of China		100	Acquired in 1978
Towed AA
Towed 57×347mm Anti-Aircraft Autocannon	AZP S-60	Soviet Union		250+	
Towed 2/4x14.5 × 114 mm Anti-Aircraft Autocannon	ZPU Type-56	Soviet Union China		336+	Multiple Variants. Many were captured by rebels during the 1997 Albanian Civil War

== Armored Vehicles ==
Type	Model	Origin	Image	No.	Details
Infantry fighting vehicle
Infantry fighting vehicle	BMP-1	Soviet Union East Germany		17	Albanian Armed Forces obtained 17 ex East German BMP-1s in 1995
Tank Destroyers
120mm wheeled ATGM Carrier	Mercedes-Benz G-Class w/HJ-8	West Germany China		N/A	Seen for the first time on military parades. Original Image
Infantry Mobility Vehicles & MRAPs
Light Tactical Vehicle	TIMAK Tactical Vehicle	Albania		40	A batch of 40 light tactical vehicles delivered to the Albanian Armed Forces on July 31, 2026. Produced by TIMAK and KAYO, these vehicles are assembled in Albania
Infantry mobility vehicle	HMMWV M1114	United States		350+	On 25 November 2015, the Minister of Defence announced in the Committee on National Security that Albanian Armed Forces would be supplied with about 250 armored vehicles (divided into 3 tranches) acquired from the Excess Defense Articles programme, part of the Defense Security Cooperation Agency, in a short-term period. In March 2017 it was confirmed that the first tranche, which amounted to 77 HMMWV up-armored M1114 variant would be delivered within the same year. The HMMWV, most likely will be the standard armoured fighting vehicle of the Albanian Land Force. Another batch of 29 HMMWVs of various variants, including ambulances, was delivered on 25 February 2021.
Infantry mobility vehicle	Iveco LMV Iveco LMV2	Italy		~25	The LMV was considered as evaluation purpose as the standard armored vehicle for the AAF. The first four were purchased in October 2015 for the Military Police. In 2018, 3 new vehicles entered service, of which two were donations of the Italian Armed Forces. Order of Iveco LMV2 ordered in August 2027.
Infantry mobility vehicle	Iveco VM 90P	Italy		250	Used By Police And Renea With Heavy Machine guns mounted on top
MRAP	Nexter Titus	Czech Republic France		20	
MRAP	Nexter Aravis	France		Less than 50	Soldiers of various units tested the Aravis in 2012 but an unknown amount was bought.
MRAP	TIMAK SHOTA	Albania		~5	In a recent announcement on social media, the Albanian Defense Minister Niko Peleshi showcased a major milestone for Albania's defense industry: the development of the country's first armored military vehicle, dubbed "Made in Albania." Peleshi stressed the importance of innovation and encouraged the nation to embrace bold progress. The announcement, made via a Facebook post, highlighted the collaborative efforts with the producer, TIMAK, in creating this revolutionary prototype. Peleshi expressed his confidence that in three weeks, at the Eurosatory fair in Paris, this Albanian product will be successfully presented on an international stage. Peleshi's message also touched on the need to overcome any feelings of intellectual inferiority, a crucial step for Albania to make its mark on the developed world. The Minister of Defense believes that by promoting innovation and trust, Albania can achieve extraordinary results in various sectors, including military technology.
MRAP	International MaxxPro Plus	United States		~46	The MaxxPro has been used by BFS since 2012 in its International Security Assistance Force mission in Afghanistan. Probably they were acquired under a leasing contract with the United States Army. In March 2017, 3 MaxxPros Plus acquired from Excess Defense Articles (EDA), part of the DSCA, were delivered to Albania. In February 2019, under the same US assistance program, another aid package consisting of 36 MaxxPro Plus and 1 MaxxPro Wrecker recovery vehicle was sent, bringing the total to 39. Unknown number donated to Ukraine in early spring 2024. The second batch included another 12 MaxxPros along with Mi-8.
Recovery Vehicles
Armoured Recovery Vehicle	International MaxxPro MRV	United States		1	1 truck, delivered in February 2019 along with 46 MaxxPro Plus variants.
Unmanned Ground Vehicles
Unmanned Ground Vehicle	iRobot PackBot 510	United States		1	
Unmanned Self-Propelled Mine-Clearing Vehicle	Bozena-4 Bozena-5	Slovakia Poland		N/A	

== Utility vehicles ==
Vehicle	Type	Origin	Image	In service	Notes
Utility Vehicles
4x4/6x6 Tactical Multirole Utility Vehicle	Steyr-Puch Pinzgauer	Austria	Pinzgauer	N/A	Seen on display at the armed forces museum in Tirana
Fiat	FIAT Nuova Campagnola 1107 / AR76	Italy		N/A	Seen on Army Repair Centers with Albanian license plate
Fiat	Fiat EGEA	Turkey		40	Donated by Turkey to the Albanian Armed Forces in 2022.
Jeep	Mitsubishi Pajero	Japan		100+	Used by Renea
SUV	Hummer H1	United States		~50 or More	Used by Renea
Wrecker truck	FMTV M1084A2	United States		Unknown	Albanian FMTV M1084A2 trucks with vehicle recovery cranes on display in Albania during the visit of U.S. officials
Multirole SUV/Pickup	Commercial Utility Cargo Vehicle	United States		~120	Specific variants are Unknown. It was seen during military parades transporting High-Ranking AAF Personnel.
Multirole Jeep	Land Rover Defender	United Kingdom Turkey		200+	The Defenders militarized version is the main utility vehicle of Albanian Armed Forces. More than 100 Land Rover Defender, which are produced by Otokar under license, were donated in two tranches in December 2013 and June 2015 by Turkish government. There are included the Land Rover Defender 150 and Defender 130 to use as utility, ambulances, and rescue vehicles, which will be join to the other part that AAF had in inventory since 2000s. Other Land Rover Defenders were also donated from the Italian Military, also used by the military police
Multirole Jeep	Mercedes-Benz G-Class	Austria West Germany		~200	No accurate info about the number, year of military activity, or the acquisition method for the G-Class. Since the late 90s, they are often used by the Albanian Armed Forces, along with the Defender, in training, convoys and missions, within the country and abroad. The G-Class number is estimated around 100 or more and is mostly used as a general utility and liaison vehicle with many variants used
Tactical Multirole Vehicle	Iveco VM 90 Torpedo	Italy		250	Used For The Army And The Medical Support
Light Armoured Armoured Police Car	Otokar Akrep	Turkey		~75	It was seen with Albanian license plates used by RENEA in 2014 Lazarat drug raid
Isuzu	Isuzu bus	Turkey		Unknown	Donated by Turkey to the Albanian Armed Forces in 2022.
Liaison Bus	Otokar Navigo	Turkey		N/A	
Van	Ford Transit VI	United States Turkey		N/A	

== Logistic trucks ==
Vehicle	Type	Origin	Image	In service	Notes
Trucks
Iveco	Iveco 320 PTM45	Italy		N/A	6x6 Tank Transporter with Bartoletti TCS 50 BO trailer. It was seen for the first time in Albanian Service towing SA-2 missiles in Tirana
Iveco	Iveco ACM 80/90 - ACL 90	Italy		~200	4x4 Tactical Truck. Electronic Warfare Variant seen multiple times, mainly in parades.
Adolph Saurer AG	Saurer 2DM	Switzerland		N/A	Seen on a Military Convoy in Korçë
MAN	MAN 22.240	West Germany Germany		N/A	Seen on a Military Convoy in Korçë
DAF	DAF YA 4440/4442	Netherlands		N/A	Seen on a Military Convoy in Korçë
Mercedes	Mercedes-Benz NG	West Germany Turkey		N/A	Seen on a Military Convoy in Korçë
UAV ground control station Platform	Ford Cargo	United States Albania Turkey		3	Used for carrying the Mobile GCS UAV ground control station paired to Bayraktar TB2 drones
Heavy Equipment Transporter	Tatra T813	Czechoslovakia		N/A	It was Seen transporting Tanks during the Kosovo war.
Mercedes	Unimog	West Germany Turkey		N/A	
Mercedes	Mercedes-Benz Actros	Germany		N/A	
Rheinmetall MAN Military Vehicles	MAN KAT1	Austria Germany		N/A	Seen towing Howitzers During a military Parade in 2002.
Isuzu	Isuzu Type 73	Japan		N/A	

== Radars & Electronic Warfare ==
Type	Model	Origin	Image	No.	Details
Radars
Long-range surveillance	GM400α	France		1	In the presence of the French Minister of the Armed Forces, Sébastien Lecornu, and Albanian Defence Minister Pirro Vengu, Thales was selected as strategic industrial partner to support a short-delivery-time request to supply a combat-proven Ground Master 400 Alpha (GM400α) air surveillance radar.
Phased array Long-Range Radar System	AN/TPS-117	United States		2	As of November 2020, Albania Air Force operates a AN/TPS-117 Long-range radar system on Mida mountain near Pukë, which was a joint investment of Albania and the US through Lockheed Martin with $38 million coming from Albania and $3 million from the US. The radar is integrated into the NATO Integrated Air Defense System.
UAV ground control station	Mobile GCS	Turkey		2	After Bayraktar Drones TB2 received, are installed in Kucova new Air Base with 2 UAV control station from Turkey
Sea maritime radar system	PRT-11 PRT-13 PRT-14 QOV PRT-20 PRT-22 Monitors SVHD PRT-19 PRT-17	United States		9	In 2014 Albania Signed a contract for 30 million $ with Lockheed Martin Company to repair and put working its Sea Maritime radar systems and in 2020 signed another contract for $750,000 with the same company for the maintenance of the system
Anti-Drone System	Morpihus	United States		1	February 2024, Minister of Defence declared that Albania is buying Anti-Drone systems
Counter-Drone device	DroneGun Mk4	United States		Unknown	Pirro Vengu the Albanian Minister of Defense posted on his Facebook a video of the Albanian Army using the DroneShield systems.
Counter-Drone device	DroneGun Tactical	United States		Unknown	Seen being used by the Albanian Army

== Aircraft ==
Name	Type	Origin	Image	No.	Details
Total Aircraft Fleet:19
Helicopters
Eurocopter AS532 Cougar	Utility helicopter	France; United Kingdom		4	On 17 December 2009, the Ministry of Defense signed a contract worth 78,633,288 Euros with Eurocopter for the purchase of 5 Eurocopter AS532 AL Cougar helicopters. The types consist of 1 VIP, 1 SAR, 1 medical evacuation, and 2 troop transportation helicopters. After the VIP helicopter crash in 2012 in the French Alps, in 2013, the Albanian side asked Eurocopter (now Airbus) to cancel the arrival of the last helicopter and its conversion to two light Eurocopter EC145M helicopters.
Airbus H145	Utility helicopter	France; Germany; Japan		2	Initially, the Ministry of Defence decided in 2011 to buy 1 Eurocopter EC145 helicopter VIP variant that will serve as an air transport for the heads of state. The contract was signed on 29 March 2011 with Eurocopter worth €5,350,000. In 2014, the new government after an accident during a test in the French Alps with an AS532 AL Cougar VIP built for AAF, decided to renegotiate the contract by replacing the Cougar helicopter with 2 Eurocopter EC145M SAR. On April 6, 2016, one of the two EC145M SAR helicopters of the Albanian Air Force crashed into Lake Skadar, where two pilots were killed during a training operation.
Bell 505 Jet Ranger X	Utility helicopter	United States		2	Two Bell 505 Jet Ranger X helicopters were observed in Albanian Air Force markings while transiting through Graz, Austria, prior to delivery to Albania.
MBB Bo 105E-4	Utility helicopter	West Germany		4	On 3 April 2006, the final contract for the delivery of 12 Bölkow-Blom MBB BO-105 lightweight twin-engine multi-role helicopters to the Republic of Albania was signed in Tirana between the Albanian Ministry of Defence and Eurocopter Deutschland GmbH. According to the Albanian Government. six of the BO-105 helicopters are designated for the Albanian Air Brigade, four for the Ministry of Interior and the remaining two for the Albanian Ministry of Health.
Agusta-Bell 205A / Bell UH-1 Iroquois	Utility helicopter	United States; Italy		3	3 UH-1 received in 2004, with a further 4 ordered for delivery through 2006. And 7 second-hand Agusta Bell-205A1 were donated by Italy in 2005
Agusta-Bell 206C	Utility helicopter	United States; Canada; Italy		3	
AgustaWestland AW109C	Utility helicopter	Italy	centro	1	Used for VIP transport
Sikorsky UH-60 Black Hawk	Utility helicopter	United States		2 (4 more on order)	In April 2019, the Minister of Defense Olta Xhaçka, stated that Albania is in talks for the acquisition of Black Hawk helicopters. In 2021, in an interview with EuroNews, US Lieutenant colonel Erol Munir stated that the number of BlackHawks will be two and they are expected to enter the service during 2023. Two Black Hawks were delivered to Albania in January 2024.
Aerial firefighting aircraft
Air Tractor AT-802	Aerial firefighting aircraft	United States		2 (1 more on order)	The Albanian Air Force received 2 Air Tractor AT-802 in 2026 for aerial firefighting and wildfire response missions. The aircraft was purchased by the Albanian Ministry of Defence.
Unmanned aerial vehicles (UAVs) (6)
RQ-20 Puma	UAV	United States		6	In July 2020, Albania expressed interest in buying 6 RQ-20B Puma Block AE. The training and preparation began in early September 2021 and the UAVs are since then used by the b2K.
Magni X	micro-UAS	Israel		Unknown	
Thor	UAS	Israel		Unknown	
Unmanned combat aerial vehicles (UCAVs)
Bayraktar TB2	UCAV	Turkey		9+ (more on order)	On 3 July 2021, Albania announced plans to acquire the Bayraktar TB2 UAV. Initially, the UAVs were only intended to be unarmed and to be used only for civil purposes such as monitoring the wildfire and the territory from Illegal constructions, as well as supporting SAR and police operations. In September 2022, during an interview, PM Edi Rama stated that 6 Bayraktar TB2 would be purchased and that, seeing the latest developments of the invasion of Ukraine, the drones would be equipped with weapons, so that in addition to the other previously stated purposes can also be used for military purposes. On 22 December 2022, Prime Minister Edi Rama announced Albania would be buying 3 new Bayraktar drones "the drones, which will be armed and ready for combat, will help authorities in a number of areas, including monitoring the Balkan country's territory, locating cannabis plantations and tracking wildfires" said Rama.
Loitering munitions (Several thousands on order)
Byker YIHA-III	Loitering munition	Turkey Pakistan		800 (First Batch) Other 2400 to be delivered	On October 10, 2024, Albanian Prime Minister Edi Rama said that Turkey will donate "a significant number of kamikaze drones" to Albania, on the sidelines of a joint press conference with Turkish President Recep Tayyip Erdogan during his official visit to Tirana. Rama did not specify the number of drones, but emphasised that "no one should be concerned about who will strike Albania, but in the context of our relations, it is a gift from Turkey. Rama also said that the acquisition of an unspecified number of Turkish kamikaze drones does not mean “Albania will attack anyone.” A spokesperson for the government contacted by Reuters was unable to provide any further details on the number or type of drones. In March 2025. The Albanian Minister of Defense has posted video on their YouTube channel where the AAF were operating the YIHA Kamikaze Drone from Turkey. The drone has a range of 60+ Km

=== Air Armaments ===
Name	Type	Origin	Image	Notes
Bombs
MAM	Laser-Guided Bomb	Turkey		For Bayraktar TB2 Drones. All variants used
Air-to-surface missiles
Roketsan Cirit	AGM	Turkey		For Bayraktar TB2 Drones
UMTAS	AGM	Turkey		For Bayraktar TB2 Drones

== Watercraft ==
=== Naval vessels ===
Class	Type	Origin	Ship	Image	Details
Corvettes (1)
Cassiopea-class patrol vessel	Patrol boat but Classed as a Corvette in Albanian Service	Italy	Libra (P 133)		Albanian Prime Minister Edi Rama announced the takeover of new warships on Saturday April 5, 2025. The main armament of the "Cassiopea" is a single Oto-Melara 76/62 Allargato gun, with weapons and fire control systems used by decommissioned Rizzo/Bergamini-class frigates. It is now learned that this ship will be a corvette type, "Cassiopeia", of the Italian Navy. Its delivery is in the process, expected in the coming days. This brand of warship is equipped militarily and with tasks mainly in maritime defense and surveillance. It is expected that this ship, after a general service and overhaul, will be active in service for up to the next 15 years.The main armament of ships of this class is a single Oto-Melara 76/62 Allargato gun with Coaxial Oerlikon KBA 25mm autocannons, with weapons and fire control systems used from the decommissioned Rizzo/Bergamini-class frigates. The ships have a flight deck and a hangar to accommodate a helicopter. The delivery of the ship will take place in a ceremony, which is expected to be attended by the Italian Minister of Defense, Guido Crosetto. The corvette is expected to be delivered under the company of the pride of the Italian Navy, 'Amerigo Vespucci'.
Anti-Pollution Vessels (2)
Siman C 1297		Italy	Rodoni Y 31 Karaburuni Y 32		
Coastal patrol vessels (48)
Iliria-class	Patrol vessel	Netherlands Albania	Iliria Oriku Lissus Butrinti		On November 13, 2007, a contract was signed with Damen Shipyards for four Stan Patrol 4207 offshore patrol vessels. The first was built in The Netherlands while the remaining three were built locally in Pashaliman Shipyard in Vlorë. It has full load displacement of 208t and total speed of 26 knots. All four vessels are armed with a remote-controlled 20mm Nexter M621 NARWHAL turret.
Cavallari-class patrol boat	Patrol vessel	Italy	CP400 CP400		Two patrol ships as a gift to Albania from Italy to enforce the protocol for migrants. After the Libra ship, two more are coming. The "gift" is contained in an amendment signed by representative Sara Kelany, head of the immigration department of Fratelli d'Italia.
Type 227	Patrol boat	Italy	R 123 R 124 R 225 R 226		Built in the years 1966–1969 in Italy. They were transferred from the Italian Coast Guard to the Albanian Coast Guard in 2002. Since then they have served as patrol boats during the summer season and the high tourist flow on the beaches. It has full load displacement of 16t and total speed of 24 knots.
2000-class	Patrol & Training boat	Italy	R 125 R 126 R 127 R 128 R 224 R 227 R 228		
5000-class	Patrol boat	Italy	8 boats		Transferred from Italian Guardia di Finanza in 2006. Since then they have been used by the Coast Guard to fight migrant or drug trafficking to Europe. It has 28t full load displacements.
Sea Spectre	Patrol Boat	United States	R 215 R 216 R 118		Transferred from the US to the Albanian Coast Guard on February 27, 1999.
PCC-class	Patrol boat	United States	R 117 R 217		They were transferred from the US to the Albanian Coast Guard on February 27, 1999. They are equipped with 12.7mm machine guns. It has full load displacement of 18t and total speed of 34 knots.
Rigid Inflatable Boat	Patrol boat	United Arab Emirates	9.5 m RIBs 7.5 m RIBs 4.7 m inflatable boats		In 2023, the Albanian Ministry of Defence received 13 boats from UAE manufacturer ASIS Boats — including two 9.5 m RIBs, four 7.5 m RIBs, and seven 4.7 m inflatable boats.
Archangel Patrol Boat	Patrol boat	United States	Archangel		USA gave 3 RM-B to Albania in 2010 and 2 more in 2013 Albania uses these RM-B patrol boats as Archangel Patrol Boats.

=== Naval armament ===
Name	Type	Origin	Image	No.	Details
Naval artillery
OTO Melara 76mm/L62 Allargato	76mm Naval Artillery	Italy		1	Main armament of the Cassiopea-class Patrol Vessel
Machine guns and Autocannons
OTO Melara 25/80 w/Oerlikon KBA	25mm Autocannon	Italy Switzerland		2	Coaxial Autocannons of the Cassiopea-class Patrol Vessel
M621 NARWHAL	20mm Autocannon	France		4	Mounted on Iliria-class patrol vessels
DShKM	12.7x108mm Heavy Machine Gun	Albania		10	Mounted on PCC-class and Sea Spectre Patrol Vessels
