= Special Operations Regiment (Albania) =

- Regjimenti i Operacioneve Speciale
- Special Operations Regiment insignia
- Active: 16 October 1998 – Present
- Country: Albania
- Branch: Albanian Armed Forces
- Type: Special forces
- Role: Unconventional Warfare; Foreign internal defense Special operations Special reconnaissance Counter-terrorism; Close-quarters combat Urban warfare Hostage rescue Underwater demolition
- Nickname: The Unit
- Motto: We better die for something than live for nothing
- Colour of Beret: Maroon
- Engagements: Kosovo War; Operation Iraqi Freedom; Operation Enduring Freedom; Resolute Support Mission; Kosovo Force

Commanders
- Current commander: Colonel Ajet Jata

Insignia
- Right shoulder patch

The Special Operations Regiment (Albanian: Regjimenti i Operacioneve Speciale), commonly known as B.O.S is the main special forces unit of the Albanian Armed Forces. It is the most elite unit of the Albanian Army. The unit is tasked with special operations in wartime, and primarily with counter-terrorism in peacetime.

The BOS members can be recognized by their maroon berets, and the unit insignia which is carried on the right sleeve of their uniforms.

== History ==
The Special Operations Battalion was created in 1998 as a direct answer to the region's geopolitical situation. Shortly after their creation, teams of BOS operators were deployed along the Albanian-Yugoslav border during the Kosovo War in 1999 and later along the Albanian-Macedonian border during that country's war in 2001. During these two conflicts, BOS' main tasks were reconnaissance and long-range patrol. In 2002, BOS operators were deployed in Afghanistan as part of Operation Enduring Freedom. In Afghanistan, the first contingents operated under Turkish command and their tasks mainly dealt with patrolling the areas around Kabul.

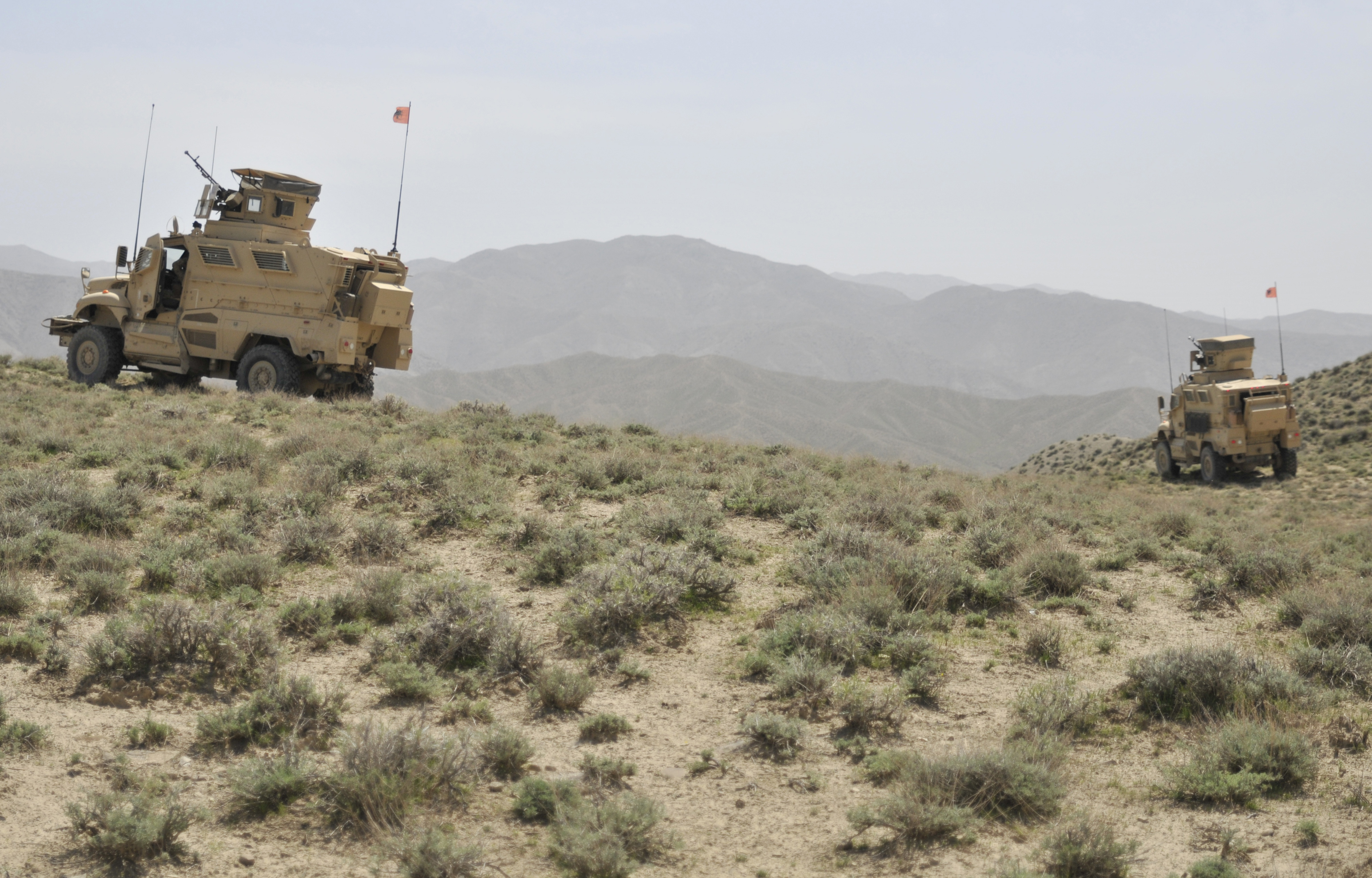
Albanian special operations forces provide security for coalition forces at an Afghan Border Police checkpoint.

In 2004, Albania sent a unit from the Special Operations Battalion to Mosul as part of Operation Iraqi Freedom. The unit together with other units from the Commando Regiment were responsible for base security and perimeter defense. In July 2010, a detachment of 44 men (codenamed EAGLE 1) from the S.O.B led by Colonel Dritan Demiraj was deployed to Kandahar, Afghanistan. Differing from previous Albanian deployments, this detachment was directly involved in combat special operations.

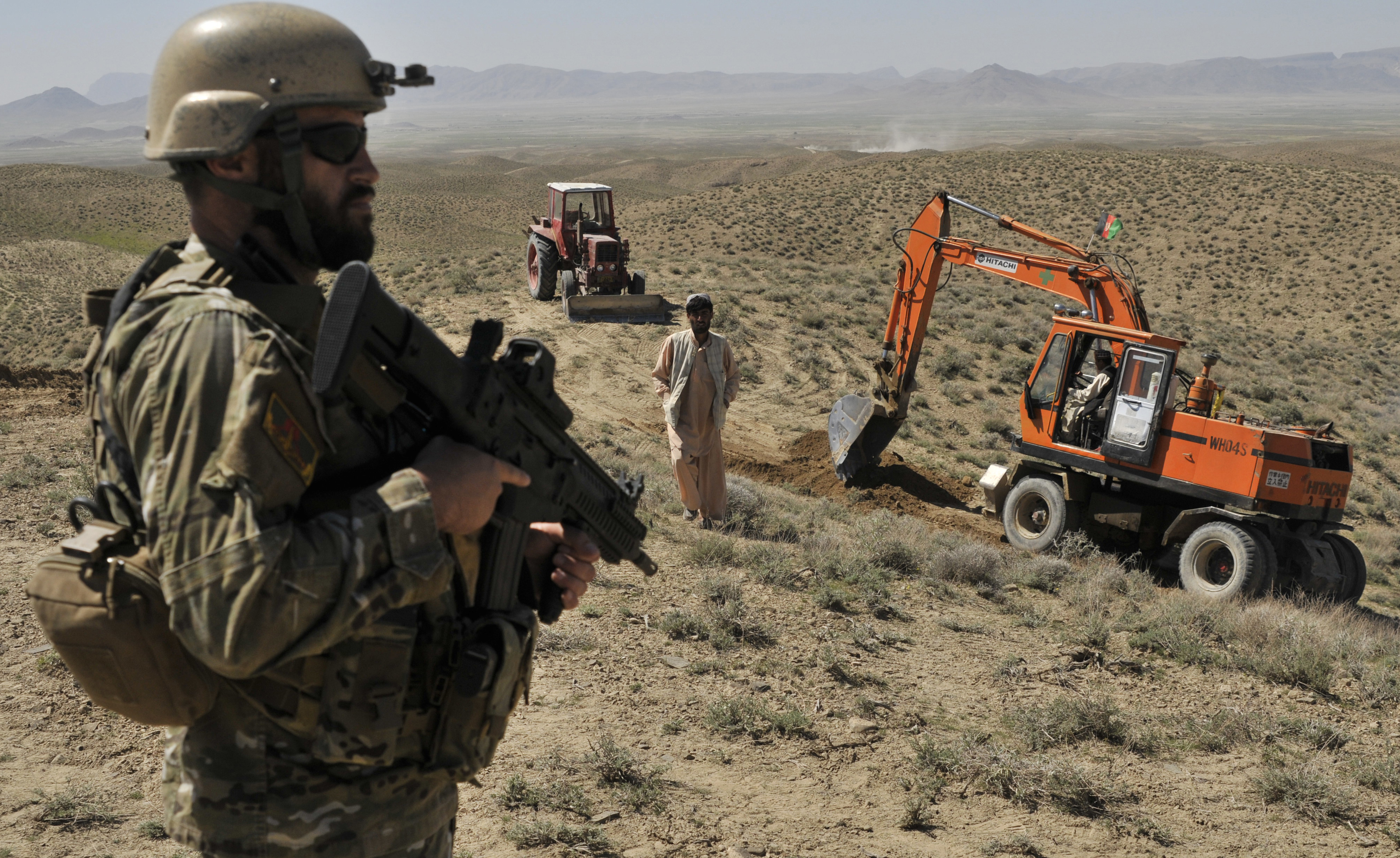
Albanian special operations forces soldier provides security as Afghan Border Police break ground on a checkpoint near the Afghanistan-Pakistan border in the Spin Boldak district of Kandahar province, Afghanistan, March 25, 2013.

The unit worked closely with US military intelligence and was responsible for deep reconnaissance behind Taliban lines, as well as intelligence collection on high-value targets.

== Recruitment, selection and training ==
All members of the Albanian land forces can be considered for special forces training. After applying, the candidates go through a 26-weeks selection process. During the first 12 weeks, the candidates are forced to march cross country against the clock, with increasing distances covered each day, culminating with a 27 km running with full kit in mountainous terrain. This is called the Commando phase.

In addition, the candidates have to go through marksmanship, navigation and physical endurance tests. During the last week of the selection process, the tests and marches go on for more than 24 hours without stopping. The candidates that are able to pass the selection process, then go through a 14-week-long training process in which they learn survival skills and master their shooting techniques. After that they undergo 4 weeks special operations and CQB course.

For the final test, the candidates are left without food for 72 hours in a remote area of the country; their objective is to evade any possible pursuer and return to base undetected.

== Commanders of note ==
- Colonel Dritan Demiraj, Commander 2007-2013 (7 Years). He is the most awarded officer in AAF. He is awarded among other medals the Presidential "Medal of Honor" 2014, Presidential "Golden Eagle Medal" 2011. Presidential Medal "Grand Master of Sports" 2018, Medal as "The best military officer of Albanian Armed Forces on 100 Anniversary of Albanian State, November 28, 2012, Minister of Interior of Albania in 2017.

== Equipment ==
Maroon Berets

=== Weapons ===
Pistols
Model	Image	Caliber	Country
Beretta Px4 Storm		9×19mm	Italy
FN Five-seven		5.7×28mm	Belgium
Glock 17		9x19mm	Austria
Heckler & Koch USP		.45 ACP	Germany
Beretta 92 Yavuz 16		9×19mm	Italy Turkey
Submachineguns
HK MP5 MKEK MP5		9x19mm	West Germany Turkey
HK MP7		HK 4.6×30mm	Germany
HK UMP		.45 ACP	Germany
Assault rifles and Carbines
Heckler & Koch G36		5.56×45mm	Germany
Heckler & Koch HK416		5.56×45mm	Germany
Beretta ARX 160		5.56×45mm	Italy
Type 56 assault rifle		7.62×39mm	China
M4A1		5.56×45mm	United States
MPT 55		5.56×45mm	Turkey
Machine guns
Rheinmetall MG3		7.62x51mm	Germany
Heckler & Koch MG4		5.56×45mm	Germany
Heckler & Koch MG5		7.62×51mm	Germany
Shotguns
Benelli M4 Super 90		12-gauge	Italy
Sniper Rifles. Designated Marksman Rifles and Anti Materiel rifles
Heckler & Koch HK417		7.62×51mm	Germany
Sako TRG		.308 Winchester	Finland
Barrett M82		.50 BMG	United States
Heckler & Koch SR9		7.62×51mm	Germany
Heckler & Koch PSG1		7.62×51mm	Germany
Anti tank Systems
AT4		84mm	Sweden United States
RPG-7		40 mm Grenade	Soviet Union
BGM-71 TOW		150mm	United States

=== Vehicles ===
Land Vehicles
Model	Image	Country	Quantity	Note
Land Rover Defender		United Kingdom	N/A	
Humvee		United States	N/A	Used in Iraq And Afghanistan
International MaxxPro		United States	40	Used by Eagle-2-8 at Kandahar

=== Aircraft ===
Helicopters
Model	Image	Country	Quantity	Note
MBB Bo 105		Germany	6	
Bell UH-1 Iroquois AB205		United States Italy	7	3 received in 2004, with a further 4 ordered for delivery through 2006
Eurocopter AS532 Cougar		France	2	
