= Military Police (Albania) =

Military Police of Albania
- Policia Ushtarake
- Coat of arms of the Military Police
- Founded: 1992; 33 years ago
- Country: Albania
- Branch: Albanian Armed Forces
- Type: Military police
- Garrison/HQ: Sauk, Tirana
- Nickname: PU/MP
- Anniversaries: 1 February
- Website: official website

Commanders
- Commander: Lieutenant Colonel Dhimitër Selmanaj

Insignia
- Flag

- Patch insignia

- Speciality badge

The Albanian Military Police (MP; Albanian: Policia Ushtarake, PU) is a provost independent branch of the Albanian Armed Forces responsible for the policing of service personnel, and for providing a military police presence both in Albania and while service personnel are deployed overseas on operations and exercises. The PU it is under the authority of Ministry of Defence. Its tasks increase during wartime to include traffic control organisation and POW and refugee control. The Military Police are distinguished from other units by their wearing of black uniform and the blue brassard worn around the left upper arm, with the "MP" lettering in white, symbol of military police.

== History ==
After the fall of the 50-year-long communist regime of Albania, there was a need to reform the Armed Forces in all its pertinent structures. On 1 February 1992, the Military Police was established upon approval by Parliament of Law No. 511, dated 08.08.1991, "On the Military Police in the Armed Forces of the Republic of Albania". The purpose of this structure was to strengthen order and discipline in AAF and it was considered as an essential thing to transform the Army according to NATO countries’ standards.

With the creation of MP, the focus of its work was to control military vehicle traffic, maintenance of military rule in order to strengthen discipline in AF. In December 1994, attached to MP, were created the structures of Criminal Police and Fire Fighting Service. In early 1995, the MP branch in General Staff was transformed into the MP directorate commanded by Brig. Gen. Bajram Malaj. Through legal support, regulations and its professionalism growing day by day, the MP ranked among the best units of the Armed Forces.

After the events of 1997, the MP Director was Col. Piro Lutaj. After the events of 1997, MP had a tremendous growth on the basis of a project with the Italian Delegation of Experts (DIE). At that time, with the assistance of Italian specialists, for the first time, the MP battalion was created in Tirana, which was equipped with the necessary logistics and materials, and it was conceived according to Italian Carabinieri battalions. The establishment of MP battalion in Tirana marks a qualitative leap in the activity of this modern structure and the most qualitative of the time, which became apparent in the events of 1998, when the MP not only suffered any damage, but it defended several state institutions such as, the Radio Televizioni Shqiptar, Albtelecom, General Prosecutor's Office and several international institutions.

Equipment of MP battalion in Tirana, with the necessary technique and armoured vehicles Iveco VM 90, played a huge role in the events of 1998 in Albania. This structure played an undeniable role in 1999, during the Kosovo crisis, when it had the major role for the welcome, escorting and treatment of refugees at camps set up in Kukës, Tirana, Durrës and other cities around the country, keeping under control the situation in the areas of Kukës, Krumë, Tropojë, especially at border posts, solving many difficult situations, escorting convoys and personalities that travelled to north and back, as well as maintaining control of the road network across the country, especially in the north. The events of 1997, 1998 and the Kosovo crisis are the most important events in the history of MP.

In late 2000, with the suppression of the structure of the MP Directorate, by the Order of the Ministry of Defence no. 1, dated 01.05.2001, “On the organization of the Military Police Regiment”, the Military Police Regiment was established and its commander was Lieutenant colonel Namik Goga. This structure exercised its activity until September 2003, protecting and safeguarding all exercises that took place on the territory of the country. In September 2003, the MP structure was transformed into a battalion structure based in Tirana and its commander was Lieutenant colonel Xhevahir Avdia, who held this office until 2005. In 2005 the commander of the battalion was appointed Lieutenant colonel Drini Nikolla, who held this office until 2008.

In July 2007, the MP battalion became an organic part of the Support Command, and its administrative management was subordinated to the Support Command, while its Operational Commanding was subordinated to the General Staff. Part of the battalion were four sections of MP in Shkodër, Durrës, Berat, Vlorë and five subsections of MP, in Kukës, Burrel, Elbasan, Korcë and Gjirokastër, where the sectors of Criminal Police, Judicial Police, vehicle traffic, Fire Fighting and Rescue conducted their activities.

In 2008, Colonel Xhevdet Zeneli became commander of the MP battalion. In May 2010, the structure of the Military Police was named Military Police of the Armed Forces in compliance with Law No. 9069 dated 15.05.2003, “On the Military Police of the Armed Forces", and MP continues to have this structure nowadays.

During these years, MP is trained by the specialists of Italian Carabineers, U.S., German and Turkish military police.

For years, MP, through a special program, is preparing a sub-unit of platoon-level NRF (NATO Response Force), a force ready to act as part of NATO relevant structure, capable and suitably equipped to perform such duties.

So far, around 50 people of Military Police have been part of different missions abroad, in Iraq and Afghanistan, in support of the Armed Forces and various international HQs. MP has also conducted a mission in “ISAF” military operation, in Kabul, Afghanistan. This platoon consisted of 22 people.

== Mission and tasks ==
Maintaining order in the AAF, detection, prevention and prosecution of criminal activity, engagement in the fight against terrorism, participation in peacekeeping and humanitarian operations and protection of state property managed and used by the Armed Forces.

The MP's tasks include:

- Ensures the military order outside the military units in public and non-public environments.
- Protects life, health and dignity of the military from any illegal act when they are offended due to his/her duty attributes.
- Protects the state property managed and used by the Armed Forces from illegal activity.
- Intervenes to avoid acts of terrorism in the Armed Forces.
- Works for the detection, prevention and prosecution of criminal activity against members of the Armed Forces, military property and facilities.
- Implements the decisions of the court, the acts of Military Prosecution on searching, capturing and bringing the military forcibly to the court when they avoid prosecution or the penitentiary.
- Controls and secures the military transport.
- Controls the movement and use of military means and technique.
- Controls and takes measures to implement legislation against Fire Intervention Measures (FIM).
- Ensures the enforcement of military order during military exercises, military ceremonies and activities organized by GSAF (General Staff of the Armed Forces).
- Escorts the military dignitaries of the Armed Forces, and counterpart foreign delegations.
- Performs duties in the interests of the Albanian military forces in missions abroad and foreign military forces operating in Albania in accordance to the laws in force.
- Performs and supports humanitarian operations.

== Structure ==
The Military Police consists of the following elements:

- Military Police, in Sauk
  - Criminal Police Section
  - Judicial Police Section
  - Military Discipline Section
  - Vehicle Traffic Inspectorate
  - Fire Protection Inspectorate
  - 1st Military Police Operations Company
  - 2nd Military Police Operations Company
  - 3rd Military Police Operations Company
  - Support Company

== Equipment and Uniform ==
=== Uniform ===
MP brassard worn on left arm

Since 2013, the Military Police uses three uniforms, including the Combat-Uniform (ACU), the Service Uniform (ASU) and the Ceremonial Uniform. Both of Service and Ceremonial uniforms are on black. The ACU usually it is the same pattern of the standard uniform of the Albanian Land Forces, but together with the service uniform, it distinguishes from other militaries officers by a blue brassard worn around the left upper arm, with the "MP" lettering in white. This patch is attached to the uniform by hook and loop fastener.

== Weapons ==
Weapon	Caliber / Type	Origin	Image	Details
Beretta ARX160	5.56×45mm	Italy		
Beretta APX	9×19mm	Italy		
ASH-78	7.62×39mm	People's Socialist Republic of Albania		
Heckler & Koch MG4	5.56×45mm	Germany		
Sako TRG	7.62×51mm 300 Winchester Magnum 338 Lapua Magnum	Finland		

=== Vehicles ===
Since the late 1990s, the Military Police mostly operates with two variants of the Iveco VM 90 military vehicle. The VM 90T Torpedo used as transport vehicle and the VM 90P Protetto which is used as armored vehicle for interventions in combat situations. However, the vehicle will remain in service until the completion of their lifecycle, since their replacement has started in 2015 in favor of Iveco LMV.

In 2015, four Iveco LMV armored vehicles were made available to the MP. These vehicles will serve to increase the technical and operational capacities of the Military Police missions and duties as well as to develop, complete and increase the operational level of the unit to perform difficult operations in high-risk areas and beyond.

== See also ==
- Albanian General Staff
- Albanian Land Force
- Albanian Air Force
- Albanian Naval Force
