= International MaxxPro =

US mine resistant armored vehicle

International M1224 MaxxPro MRAP
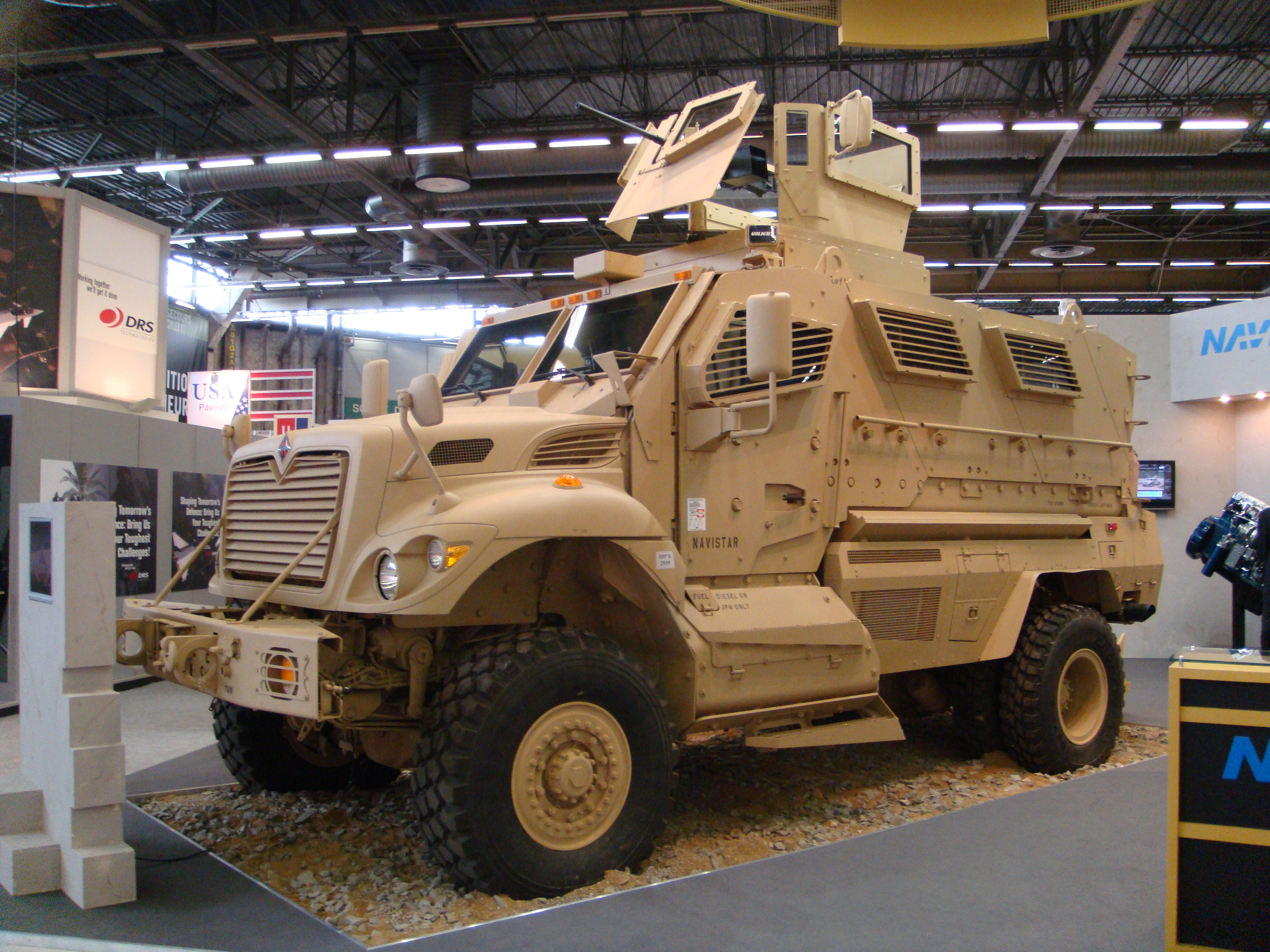
- MaxxPro
- Type: Mine-Resistant Ambush Protected Vehicle

Service history
- Used by: See operators
- Wars: War in Afghanistan; Insurgency in Khyber Pakhtunkhwa; Syrian Civil War; War in Iraq (2013–2017); Republican insurgency in Afghanistan; Russo-Ukrainian War; Haitian conflict 2026 Afghanistan–Pakistan war

Production history
- Designer: International Truck
- Designed: 2007
- Manufacturer: International Truck
- Produced: 2007–present
- No. built: 9,000

Specifications
- Mass: 21T (MaxxPro); 24T (MaxxPro Plus); 24T (MaxxPro Long Wheelbase); 22.2T (MaxxPro Dash); 21T (MaxxPro Dash DXM); 24T (MaxxPro Ambulance)
- Length: 21.17–23.5 ft (6.5–7.2 m)
- Width: 8.25 ft (2.5 m)
- Height: 10 ft (3 m)
- Crew: 3–7
- Engine: 9.3L, 570 cubic inches MaxxForce D9.3I6 I6; 330 hp (250 kW) @ 2,100 rpm; 375 hp (280 kW) in Plus and Dash variants
- Power/weight: 18.9–20 hp/US ton
- Payload capacity: 3,650–11,150 lbs (1.6–5 t)
- Transmission: Allison 3000 5-speed automatic
- Suspension: 4×4, wheeled semi-elliptical leaf springs
- Ground clearance: 14" (0.35 m)
- Steering system: 58–68 ft (18–21 m) turning circle

The International M1224 MaxxPro MRAP (Mine-Resistant Ambush Protected) is an armored fighting vehicle designed by American company Navistar International's subsidiary, Navistar Defense, which both designed and manufactured the vehicle's armour. The vehicle was designed to take part in the US military's Mine Resistant Ambush Protected vehicle program, led by the US Marine Corps, as well as a similar US Army-led Medium Mine Protected Vehicle program.

MRAPs are categorized as category 1 or category 2, depending on usage and passenger compartment space, and Navistar produces the MaxxPro in both sizes, although the vast majority of those sold have been category 1 MRAPs. The MaxxPro Plus model comes with dual rear wheels for increased load carrying capacity, such as an ambulance or EFP protected variant. The latest model produced is the MaxxPro Dash, which is a smaller and lighter category 1 model. Both the Plus and Dash models use the MaxxForce 10 engine with 375 hp, in place of the DT 530 with 330 hp, used in the original base model produced.

== Design ==
The M1224 MaxxPro base model uses a crew capsule with a V-shaped hull, mounted on an International 7000 chassis. The V-hull deflects the blast of a land mine or improvised explosive device (IED) away from the vehicle to protect its occupants. Because the chassis is mounted outside the armored crew capsule, there are concerns that it will likely be destroyed in the event of an ambush, leaving the soldiers inside stranded. However, according to Navistar Defense spokesperson Roy Wiley, the MaxxPro "did extremely well during the tests, and we are extremely pleased." This design may prove as effective as the Krauss-Maffei Wegmann ATF Dingo that uses a similar design, one which mounts an armored capsule to a Unimog chassis. This design has survived a 7 kg (15 lb) land mine blast with no injuries.

According to Navistar Defense, the vehicle is designed with operational readiness in mind and uses standardized, easily available parts, to ensure rapid repair and maintenance. The armored body is bolted together instead of welded, as in other MRAPs. This facilitates repair in the field and is a contributing factor to Navistar's greater production capacity for the MaxxPro.

In 2010, the Army initiated a development effort to add electronic stability control (ESC), a computerized technology designed to improve vehicle stability, to the MaxxPro. The MaxxPro's high ground clearance provides greater protection from underbody blasts, but also raises its center of gravity, causing rollovers in certain situations. The ESC combines road factors, vehicle data, and driver intent to automatically correct driving to ensure stability during maneuvers. Installation on MaxxPros began in late 2014 and is to be completed by late 2017, with other MRAPs planned to have ESC integrated onto them.

== Production ==
Initially just two vehicles were delivered for testing at the Aberdeen Proving Ground in March 2007.

Following testing, a first order for 1,200 MRAP Category 1 MaxxPro vehicles was placed by the US Marine Corps Systems Command on 31 May 2007 for delivery by February 2008. However, as the U.S. Army Research and Development laboratory is overseeing the entire MRAP program, it is unclear which branches of the US Armed Services will be receiving the vehicles, and in what numbers. The contract was worth over $623 million, making it then the biggest MRAP contract to date. The US Marine Corps plans to replace all HMMWVs "outside the wire" in Iraq with MRAP vehicles.

A further order for 16 Category 2 versions (dubbed MaxxPro XL) was placed on 19 June 2007 for delivery by September 2007.

An additional 755 Category 1 MaxxPros were ordered on 20 July 2007, also for delivery by February 2008, and a third order for a further 1,000 vehicles was announced on 18 October 2007.

In the final order of 2007 a further 1,500 Category 1 MaxxPros were ordered bringing the total to 4,471. Of total MRAP orders to the end of 2007, 45% are MaxxPros (66% of Category 1 MRAPs).

In the first order of 2008, 743 Category I MaxxPros were ordered. The MaxxPro was by now the only Category I MRAP still receiving fresh orders.

On 19 September 2012, Navistar received an order worth $282 million to upgrade more than 2,300 MaxxPro Dash vehicles to the MaxxPro Dash ISS version. The upgrades include the Diamond Xtream Mobility Independent suspension system. The upgrade is designed to give the vehicles improved capability and technology for a lower cost than purchasing a brand-new vehicle. Work began in December in Afghanistan in the field and was completed by June 2013.

About 9,000 MaxxPro vehicles were bought by the U.S. Army between 2007 and 2011, and they plan to keep only about 3,000 of them. Navistar is pitching the MaxxPro MRAP as a vehicle that can be upgraded into a mobile command post or power generator. With budget cuts, the plan would allow the Army to get solutions they want from the existing fleet. The company is also planning to make it a maintenance vehicle and mortar carrier.

=== M113 replacement ===
Navistar considered modifying the MaxxPro to fit Army requirements for the Armored Multi-Purpose Vehicle program to replace the M113 family of vehicles. Navistar felt that although it has less capabilities such as gap crossing, their wheeled MRAP could be capable enough to meet the solutions required and be cheaper by selecting a vehicle already in the inventory. Navistar offered the MaxxPro as a stop-gap solution to replace the M113 quickly with the more survivable MRAP, to be used until the AMPV can be fielded in 2020. BAE Systems was awarded the AMPV contract in December 2014.

The company is also pitching the MaxxPro to replace the M113 in units above brigade level not directly involved in fighting for the same cost saving reasons.

== Variants ==
=== MaxxPro Plus M1224 ===
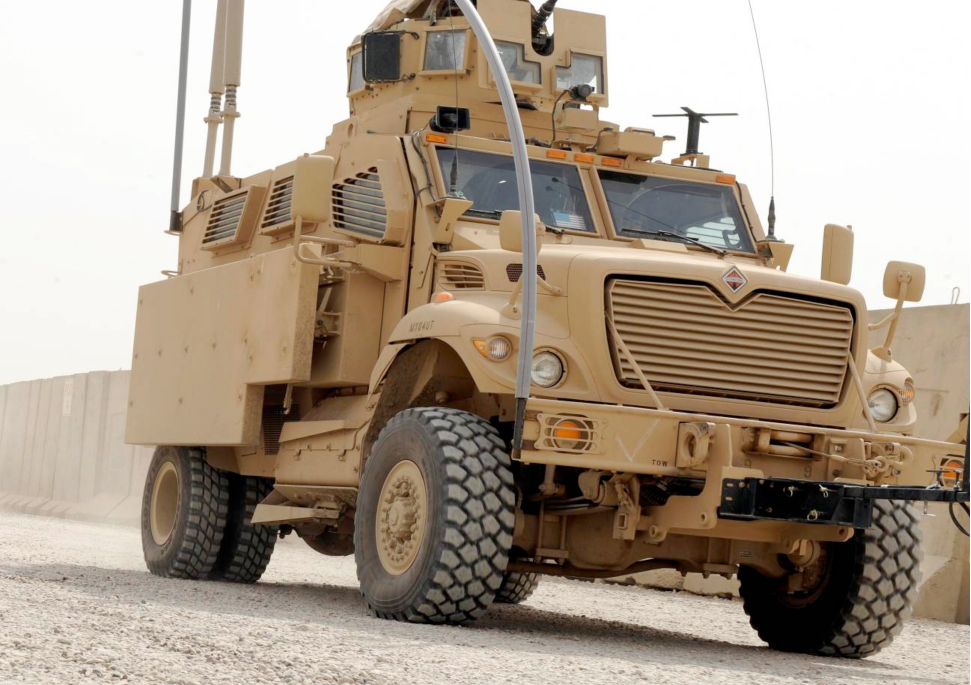
MaxxPro Plus with Frag Kit 6.

On 16 June 2008 Navistar debuted a new version called MaxxPro Plus. MaxxPro Plus has increased engine power and payload, as well as Frag Kit 6 enhancements for increased explosively formed penetrator protection.

=== MaxxPro Dash M1235 ===
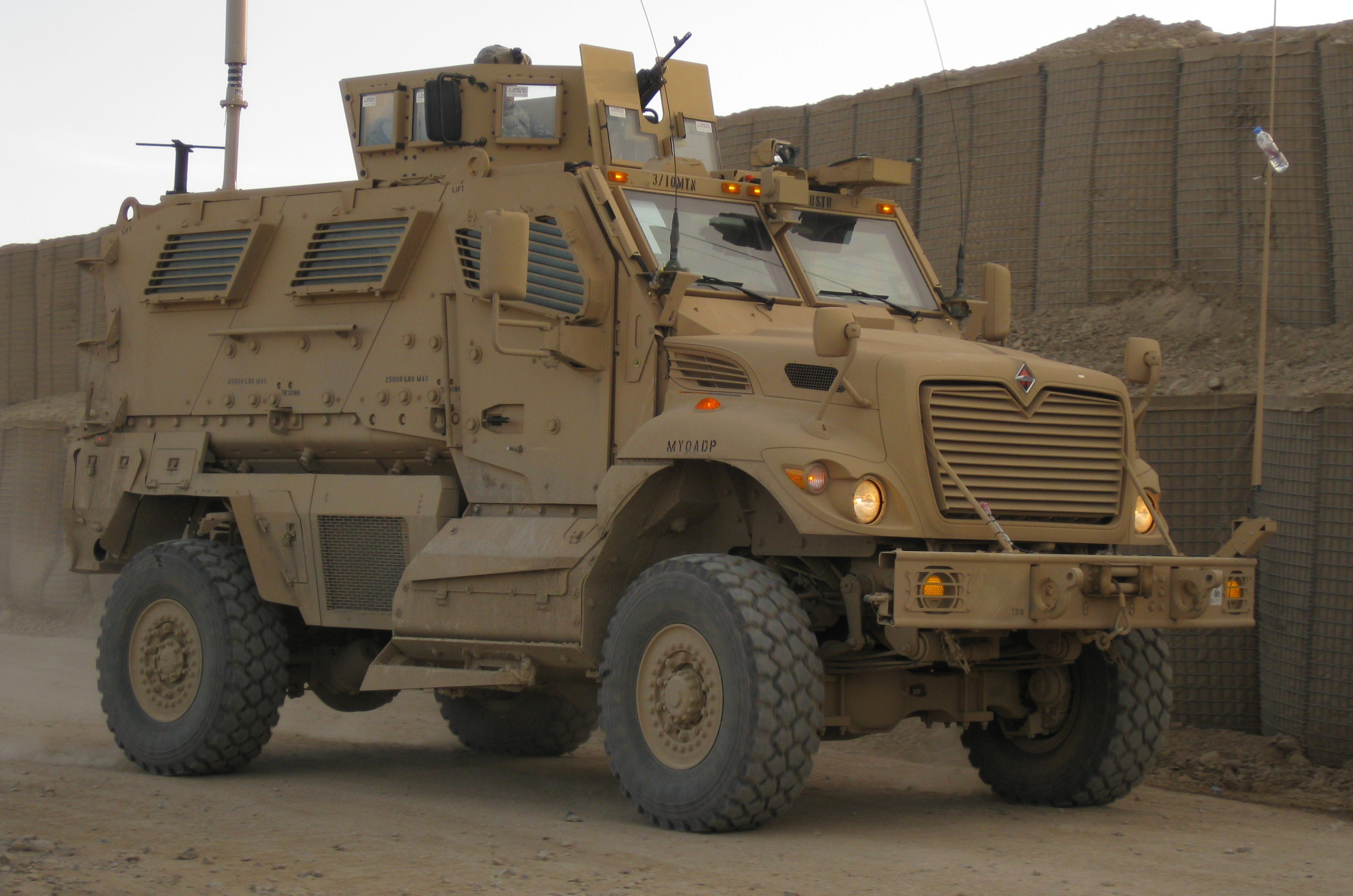
MaxxPro Dash

On 4 September 2008 the U.S. Marine Corps awarded Navistar a $752 million contract to develop and produce a lighter, smaller, and more mobile MaxxPro variant that is less prone to the rollover problems that have plagued MRAP vehicles. MaxxPro Dash M1235A1 has a smaller turning radius and higher torque to weight ratio. Production of the MaxxPro Dash began in October 2008 with delivery of 822 units completed by February 2009.

==== MaxxPro Dash DXM M1235a1 ====
MaxxPro Dash with improved DXM suspension system.

==== MaxxPro Dash DXM Ambulance ====
On 5 May 2011 Navistar Defense received a $183 million delivery order for 250 International MaxxPro Dash ambulances with DXM independent suspension.

=== MaxxPro XL ===
The MaxxPro XL is a Category II MRAP version of the MaxxPro. It is a larger and longer version of the base vehicle. Because it is longer, it has three bullet-resistant windows on each side, instead of two. The MaxxPro XL can carry up to 10 soldiers.

=== MRV ===
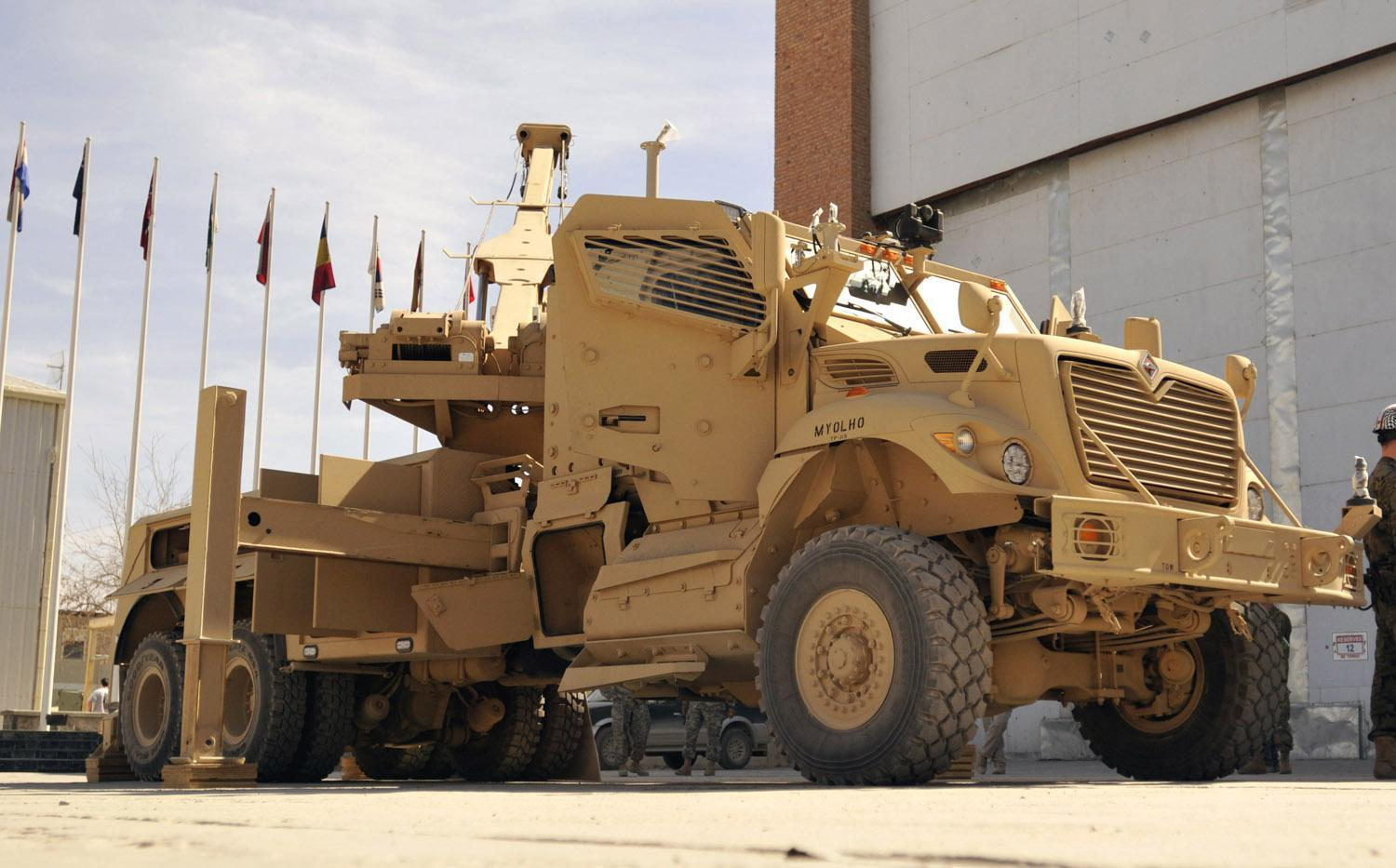
MaxxPro MRV

There is also an MRAP Recovery Vehicle; 250 have been ordered. These are well suited to recovering other vehicles which have been damaged by IEDs.

On 18 July 2011 Navistar Defense received a delivery order for an additional 140 MRVs with rocket-propelled grenade (RPG) nets from the U.S. Marine Corps Systems Command.

Uzbekistan is known to be a user of the recovery vehicle version of the MRAP

=== MCOTM ===
At Association of the United States Army 2013, a version called the Mission Command on the Move (MCOTM) was displayed as a command post with monitors, computers, and antennae mounted in the back for communications and surveillance. Five passengers can monitor incoming information, see unmanned aerial vehicle feeds, and keep track of where units are operating. The vehicle has an on-board transmission-integrated power generator that can produce up to 120 kilowatts of exportable power, which eliminates the need for a towed trailer and can single-handedly power a semi-permanent tactical operations center. It would allow commanders to be connected to dismounted troops and headquarters while on the move. The MCOTM version will undergo testing at the Army's network integration evaluations in February 2014.

== Operators ==
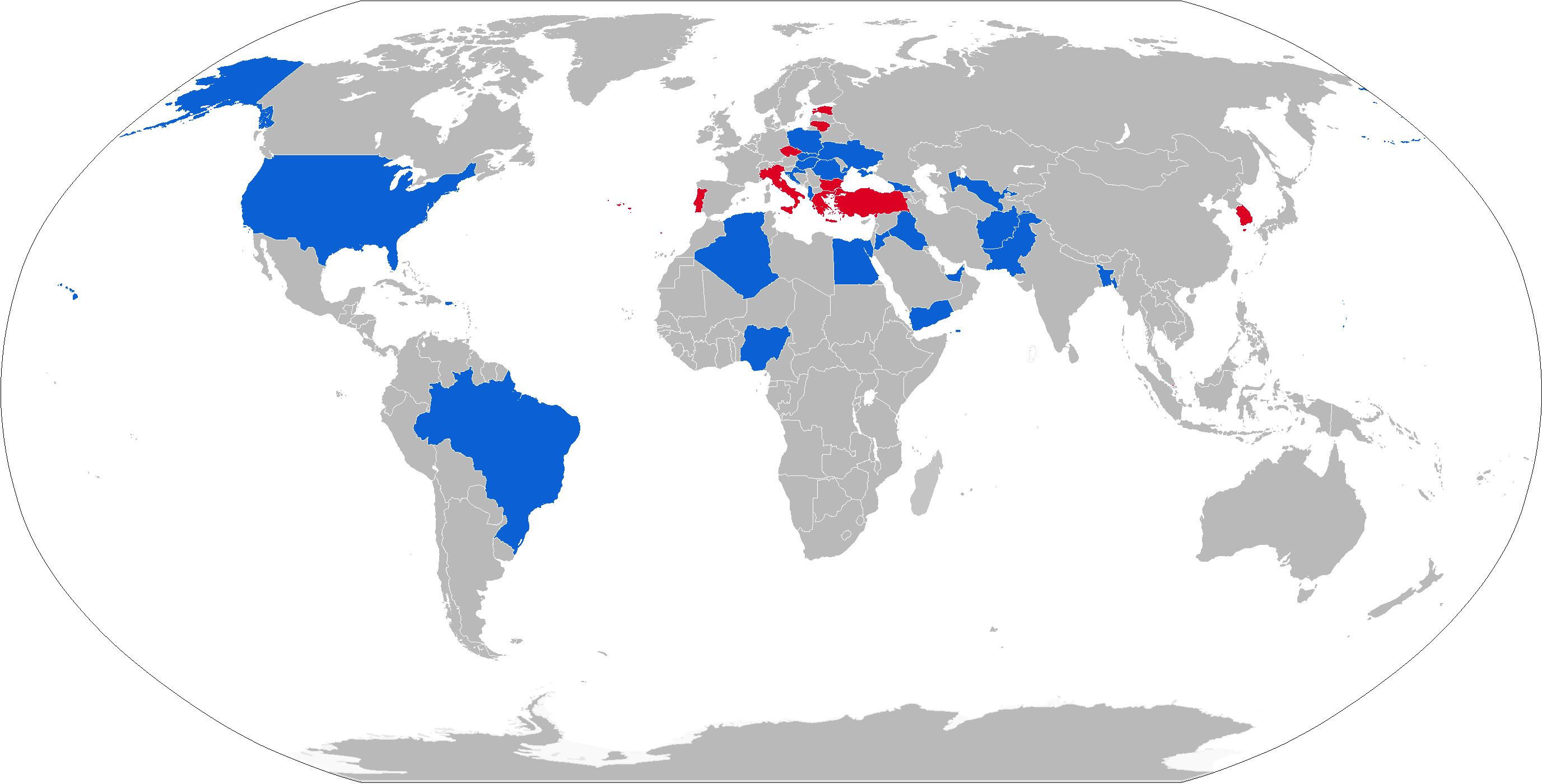
Operators Current Former

=== Current operators ===
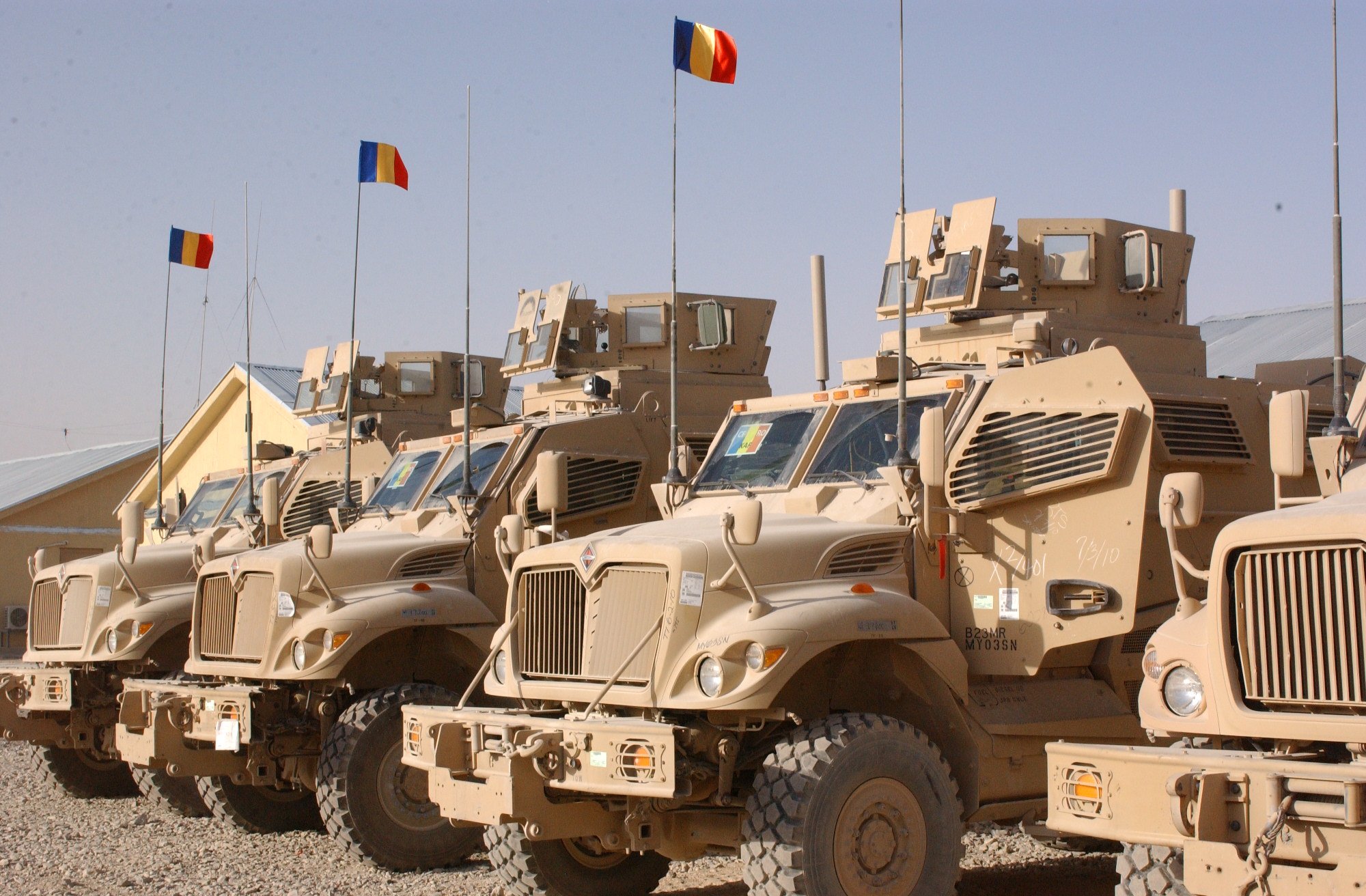
The first eight MaxxPros in use of the 811th "Dragonii Transilvani" Maneuver Battalion and the 812th "Șoimii Carpaților" Maneuver Battalion deployed in Zabul Province, Afghanistan.

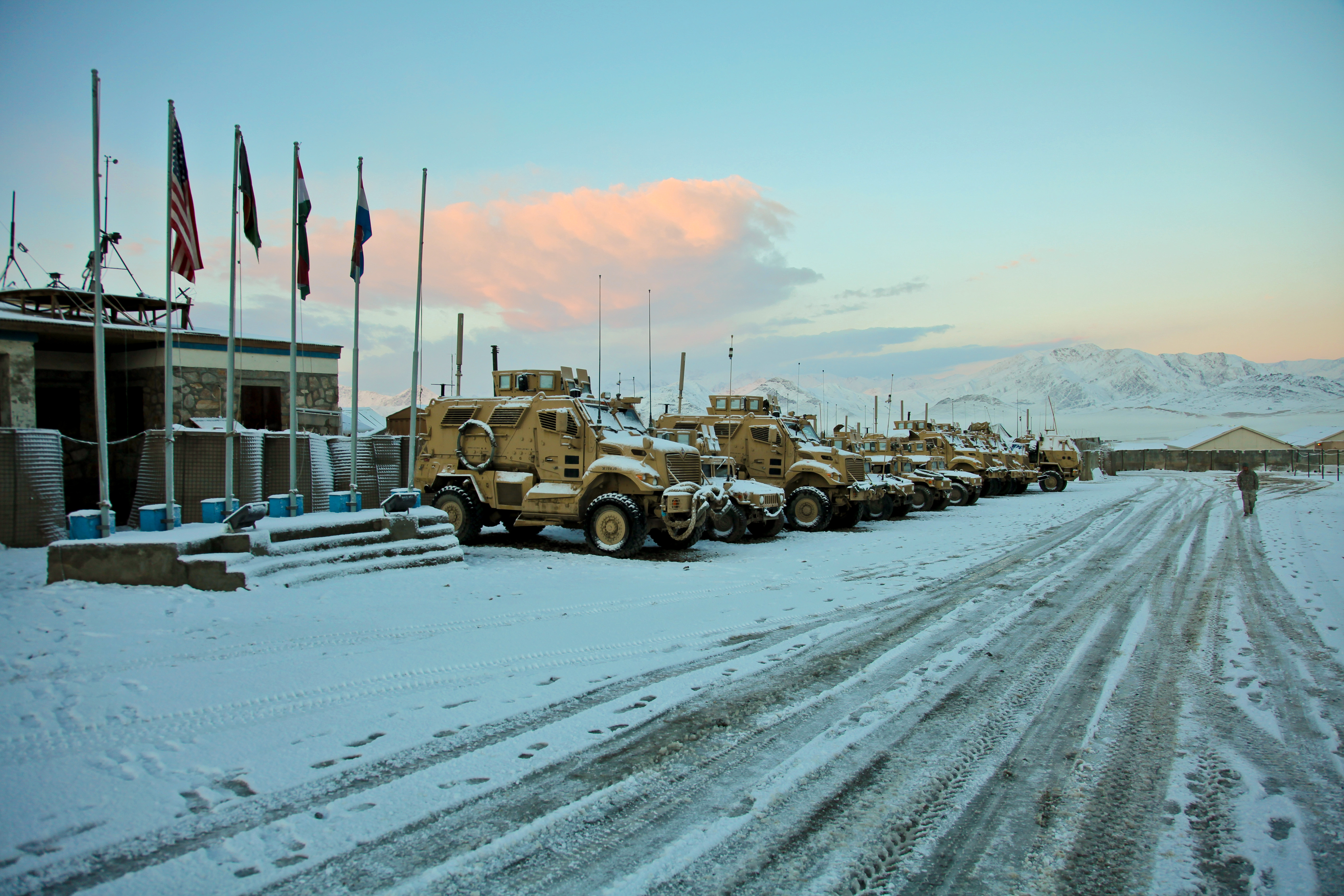
U.S. MaxxPros parked at a base in Maidan Wardak Province, Afghanistan

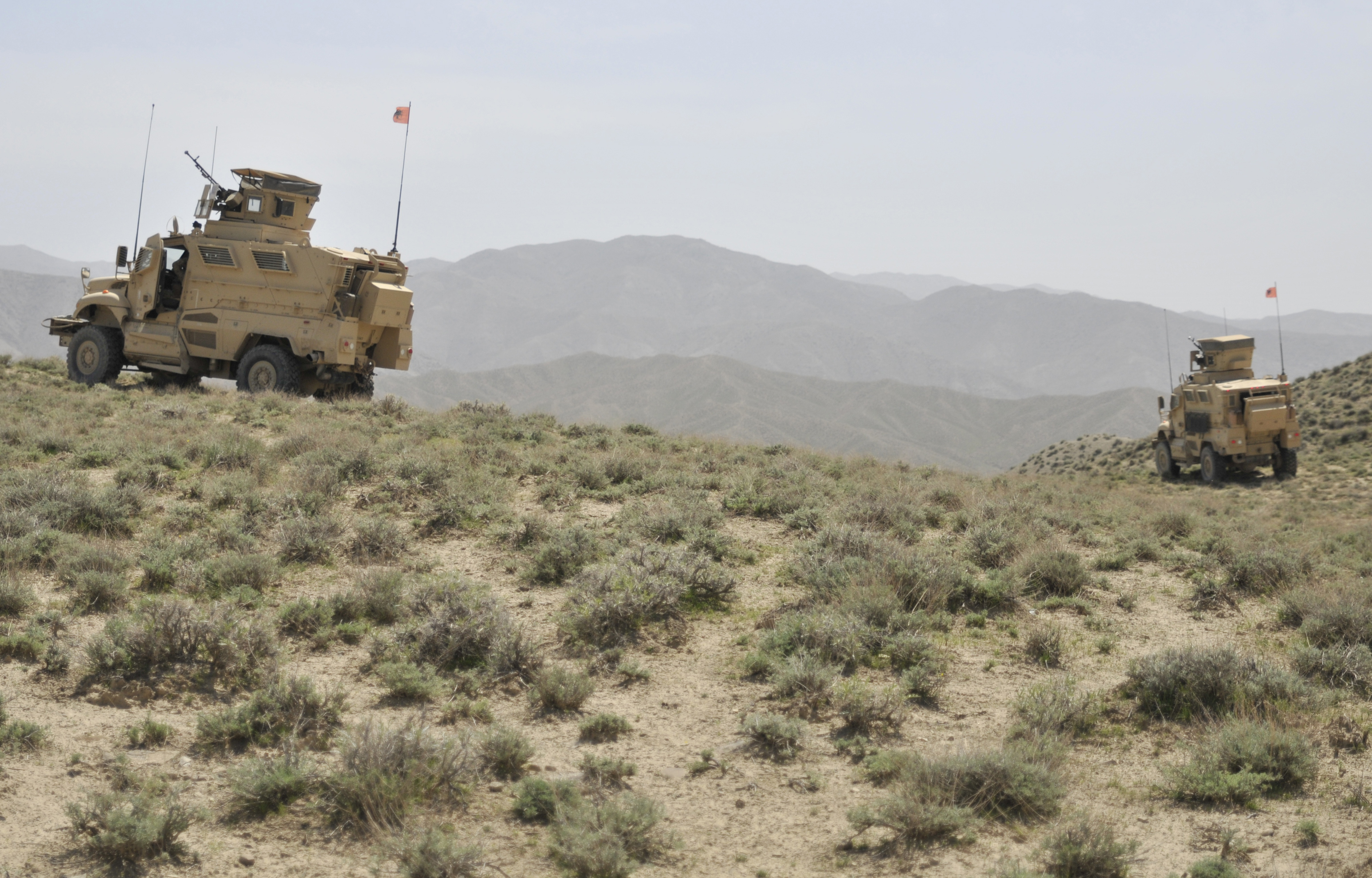
Elements of Albanian Special Operations Battalion provide security for coalition forces at an Afghan Border Police checkpoint.

- Afghanistan - 30 mine-resistant ambush-protected vehicles (MRAPs) were abandoned after being disabled by U.S. forces in the Western withdrawal from Afghanistan in 2021. In the following year the vehicles were seen being used in the Taliban army's victory parade.
- Algeria – used by the special forces, 116th Operational Maneuvers Regiment (116e RMO)
- Albania – 38 used by the Special Operations Battalion
- Bangladesh – 81 in service with the Bangladesh Army with plans for additional units.
- Brazil – 20 in service with the Brazilian Army since 6 August 2023.
- Georgia
- Egypt – 12 MaxxPro MRAP Recovery Vehicles (MRV)
- Hungary – 42 MaxxPros in service, with the last 12 received in September 2013. 12 more loaned to the Hungarian Army on 26 November 2013 for training.
- Iraq – used by the Iraqi Counter Terrorism Service.
- Jordan 100 MaxxPros in service with the Jordanian Armed Forces.
- Kurdistan Region – Supplied by the United States.
- Nigeria – In service from 2016.
- Pakistan – 525 MaxxPro MRAPs of different versions in service with the armed forces, and an additional 37 MaxxPro MRVs in service as well. Some reports claimed that Pakistan received or smuggled the MaxxPros left in Afghanistan by the US during the withdrawal from Afghanistan.
- Romania – 60 MaxxPro Dashes in service Romanian Land Forces
- Slovakia – Donated to the Slovak Army by the United States.
- Syrian Democratic Forces
- United Arab Emirates – 3,375 MaxxPros of various versions on order.
- Ukraine – 462 (440 from United States and 22 from Albania).
  - According to the Oryx blog, as of 22 December 2025, 350 units were lost of which: 279 were destroyed, 16 damaged, 32 abandoned and 23 captured by Russian forces.
- Uzbekistan
- United States
  - United States Air Force
  - United States Army
  - United States Marine Corps

2,934 total: 2,633 MaxxPro Dash; 301 MaxxPro LWB (Ambulance) as of January 2025.

=== Former operators ===
- Afghanistan – 70 mine-resistant ambush-protected vehicles (MRAPs) by 2021.
- Croatia – 35 were in service with Croatian Army, 5 with Croatian contingent in Afghanistan. In April 2014, the U.S. Army donated 30 MRAP MaxPro to the Croatian Army.
- Bulgaria – 4 in service with the Bulgarian Army, all deployed in Afghanistan
- Czech Republic – used by Czech army in Afghanistan.
- Estonia – 6 MaxxPros in service with the Estonian Afghanistan Contingent.
- Greece – 5 MaxxPros under leasing, from the US Army, were deployed in Afghanistan. These 5 vehicles were given back to US Army after Hellenic Army disengaged from ISAF in October 2012.
- Italy – 24 In leasing with Italian Army from 2012 to 2016
- Lithuania – Used by special forces in Afghanistan.
- Poland – 30 MaxxPro in service in Afghanistan with the Polish Land Forces since September 2010 on ACSA terms, then MaxxPro Dash
- Portugal – 15 MaxxPro were in service with Portuguese Army in Afghanistan until April 2021.
- Singapore – 15 MaxxPro Dashes in service with Singapore Army, deployed in Afghanistan as part of NATO-led International Security Assistance Force.
- South Korea – 10 MaxxPro Dashes in service with Republic of Korea Army, deployed in Charikar, Afghanistan under "Ashena" unit, as part of International Security Assistance Force.
- Turkey – Several MaxxPros donated from the US Army were deployed in Afghanistan.

=== Civilian operators ===
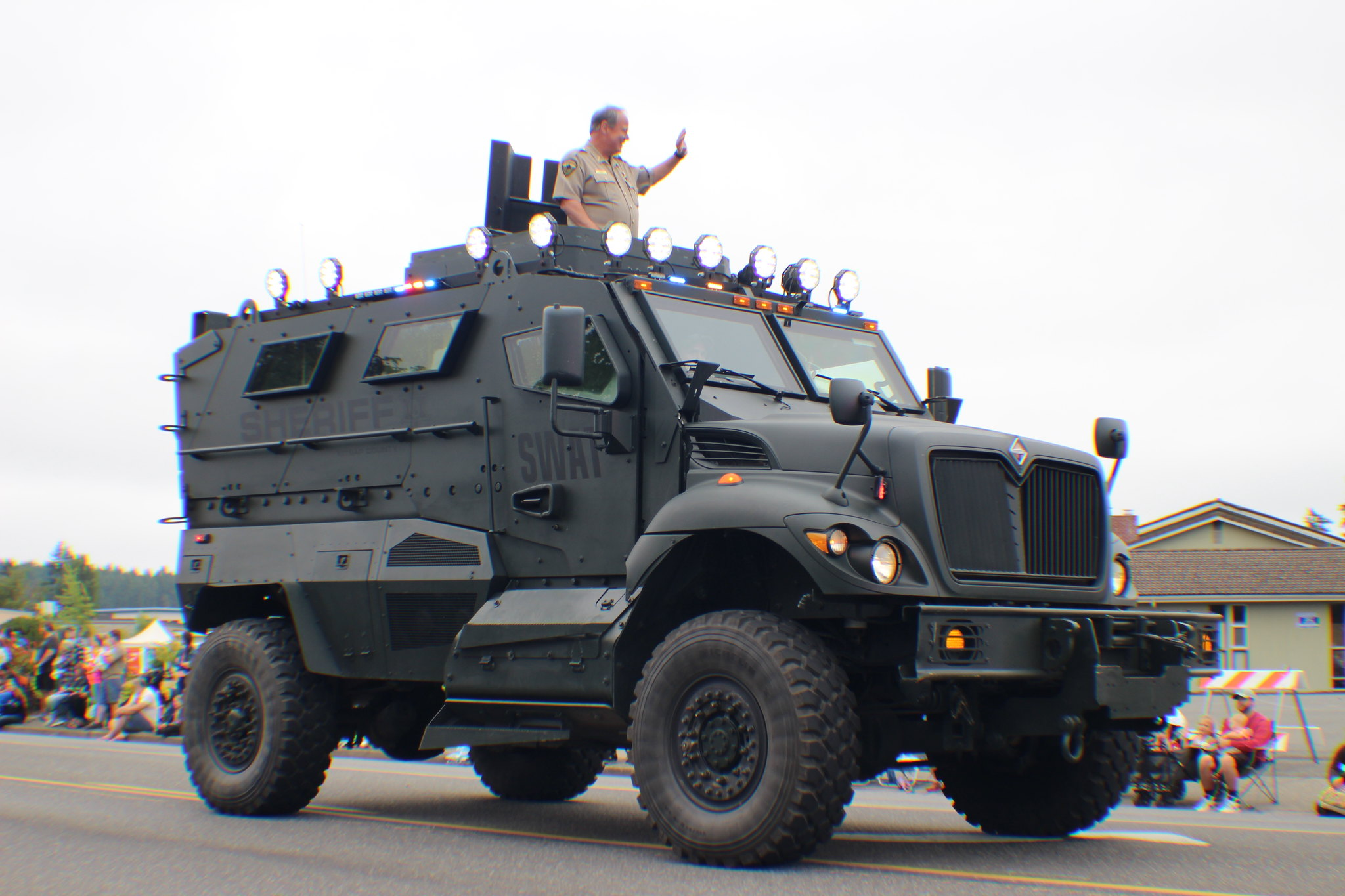
A civilian-operated MaxxPro of the Kitsap County Sheriff's Office SWAT team, Silverdale, Washington.

- United States
  - U.S. Department of Homeland Security
  - Citrus Heights Police Department
  - Clovis Police Department
  - Sarpy County Sheriff Department
  - Davis Police Department
  - Dakota County Sheriff's Office
  - Dallas County Sheriff's Office
  - Delaware Police Department
  - Gallatin and Hendersonville, Tennessee police departments
  - Hamtramck Police Department
  - Jefferson County Police
  - New Castle, PA Police Department
  - Ohio State University Department of Public Safety
  - Pinetop-Lakeside Police Department
  - Salinas Police Department
  - Yreka Police Department
  - West Melbourne Police Department

== See also ==
- International FTTS
- International MXT-MV
