= Beretta ARX160 =

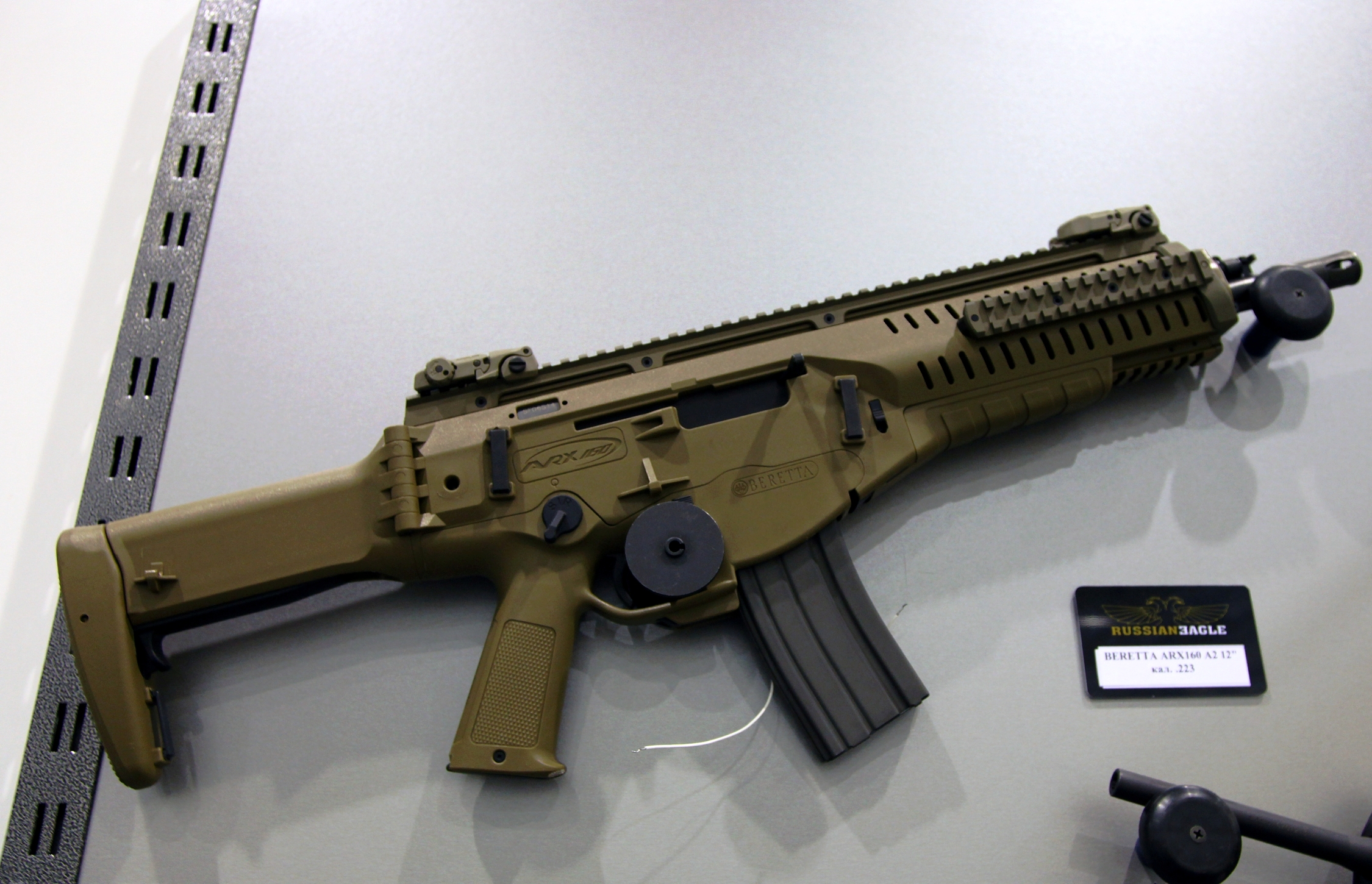
- Beretta ARX160 A2 with 305 mm (12 in) barrel
- Type: Assault rifle Carbine; ARX200: Battle rifle, designated marksman rifle
- Place of origin: Italy

Service history
- In service: 2008–present
- Used by: See Users
- Wars: War in Afghanistan (2001–2021); Operation Sinai; Mexican drug war Russian invasion of Ukraine

Production history
- Designer: Ulrich Zedrosser
- Designed: 2008
- Manufacturer: Beretta
- Produced: 2008–present
- Variants: See Variants

Specifications
- Mass: 3.0 kg (6.6 lb) (empty with 304 mm (12.0 in) barrel); 3.1 kg (6.8 lb) (empty with 406 mm (16.0 in) barrel)
- Length: 914 mm (36.0 in) (stock extended); 864 mm (34.0 in) (stock collapsed); 686 mm (27.0 in) (stock folded) (with 406 mm (16.0 in) barrel); 813 mm (32.0 in) (stock extended); 762 mm (30.0 in) (stock collapsed); 584 mm (23.0 in) (stock folded) (with 304 mm (12.0 in) barrel)
- Barrel length: 406 mm (16 in); 350 mm (14 in); 280 mm (11 in); 305 mm (12 in) (ARX160 SF)
- Width: 80 mm (with extended stock)
- Cartridge: 5.56×45mm NATO; 7.62×39mm 7.62×51mm NATO (ARX200).22 Long Rifle (ARX160 22 LR)
- Action: Gas-operated rotating bolt
- Rate of fire: 700 rounds/min
- Muzzle velocity: 920 m/s
- Effective firing range: 5 position rear sight up to 600 m (656 yd)
- Feed system: 30-round detachable STANAG Magazine, 100-round detachable C-Mag drum magazine (5.56×45mm NATO); 20-round Box magazine (7.62×51mm)
- Sights: Back-up folding iron sights and integrated Picatinny rail for various optical sights

The Beretta ARX160 is an Italian modular assault rifle manufactured by Beretta. Developed for the Italian Armed Forces as part of the Soldato Futuro (English: "Future Soldier") program, the ARX160 was launched in 2008 as a commercial weapon system independent from the Soldato Futuro ensemble, complete with a companion single-shot 40×46mm NATO low-velocity grenade launcher, called the GLX160, which can be mounted underneath the rifle or used with an ad hoc stock system as a stand-alone weapon.

In late 2015, Beretta introduced the Beretta ARX200 chambered in 7.62×51mm NATO cartridge.

== History ==
The Beretta ARX160 was launched in 2008 as a commercial weapon system and was developed for the Italian Armed Forces as part of the layered Soldato Futuro (Future Soldier) program. The current program aims to replace the older Beretta AR70/90 as the standard assault rifle for the Italian Armed Forces.

The project started as an evolution of the Beretta AR 70/90 and Beretta SC 70/90 and was initially presented as a simple update of the construction materials and addition of small changes to the Beretta AR 70/90. Later a more elaborate prototype was then introduced, which introduced a stock that was not foldable but adjustable in length and the cocking lever in the upper front position, a feature however not comfortable during use. Subsequent developments led to the definitive version of the ARX160, which is currently in production and has supplanted all the three versions its predecessor, the AR 70/90.

The Italian Army ordered a first batch of 800 weapons in 2008 for field trials in Afghanistan, which was followed by orders for 11,500 units in 2010 and 10,000 in 2012. Between 2008 and 2014, there were around 30,000 ARX160 SFs that are chambered in 5.56×45mm NATO cartridge that have been supplied to the Italian Army, Italian Navy, Italian Air Force and Italian Special Forces.

In 2012, Beretta introduced the 7.62×39mm configuration of the ARX160, and on the same year Beretta also introduced the ARX160 A2 which is currently in use with the Italian Army and Special Forces.

In 2013, Beretta introduced the ARX160 A3, which features improvements to its original design. The improvements includes a redesigned handguard with an improved heat ventilation and an extended Picatinny rail on its bottom, and an improved pistol grip design.

In 2014, the Italian Ministry of Defence allocated US$2.7 million to Beretta for the development of the ARX200 battle rifle. Also, the Italian Armed Forces has announced a possible requirement for 1,170 rifles chambered in 7.62×51mm NATO cartridge.

In late 2015, the Beretta ARX200 battle rifle was introduced and is being supplied to the Italian Army. It is a distant derivative of the ARX160 modular assault rifle. It has passed the following military and environmental tests; cold and hot temperature, temperature and humidity, ice, salt fog, heavy rain, salt water, sand and dust, mud, unlubricated, double feeding proof, and barrel obstruction proof.

=== Foreign interest ===
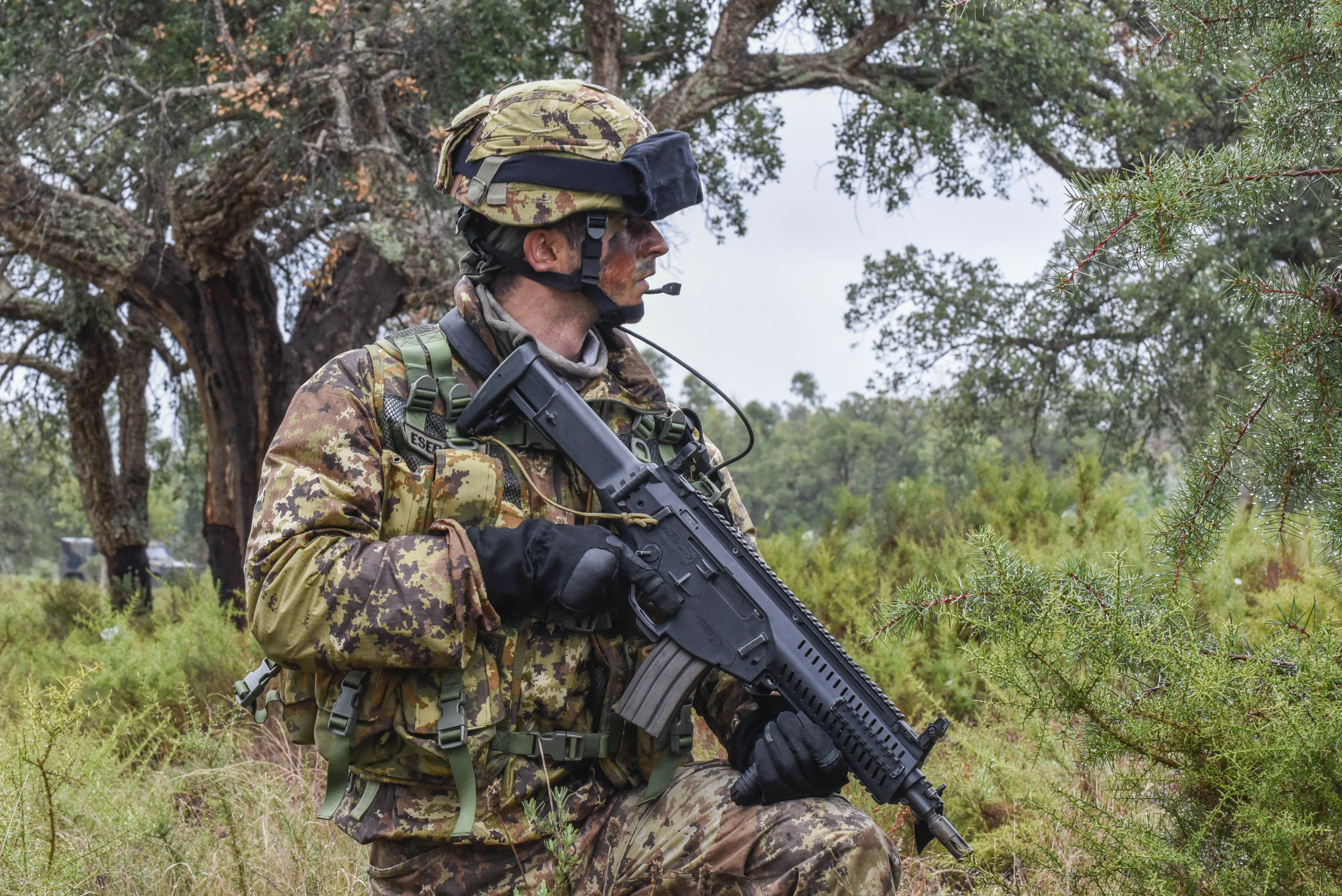
Italian Lagunari reconnaissance soldier with the ARX160 SF

The Beretta ARX160 was one of the five Phase II contenders in the United States Army Individual Carbine competition to replace the M4 carbine. The Individual Carbine competition was cancelled before a winning weapon was chosen.

In February 2013, the Argentine Army received an ARX160 rifle and GLX160 grenade launcher for evaluation for their special forces. In December 2016, state-owned Argentine arms manufacturer Fabricaciones Militares signed a deal with Beretta to produce the ARX200 under license. No news of the arrangement have surfaced since then. It is unknown if the agreement has been cancelled, though likely.

The Indian Army tested the ARX160 as a replacement for the INSAS rifle. The tender was retracted in June 2015.

The ARX160 A3 was one of the 5 finalists of the French Army tender to replace the FAMAS, eventually won by the German-made HK416.

In January 2019, the Romanian Armed Forces have chosen the ARX160 A3 to replace the old PM Md.1963 (7,62 x 39 mm) and PM Md.1986 (5,45 x 39 mm) of the Romanian Land Forces. Production was expected to start in autumn 2019 at Uzina Plopeni of ROMARM. As the project failed to materialize at Plopeni, it was moved to the Cugir Arms Factory in 2023. The factory could start its operations on the Beretta project at the end of August 2024.

== Design ==
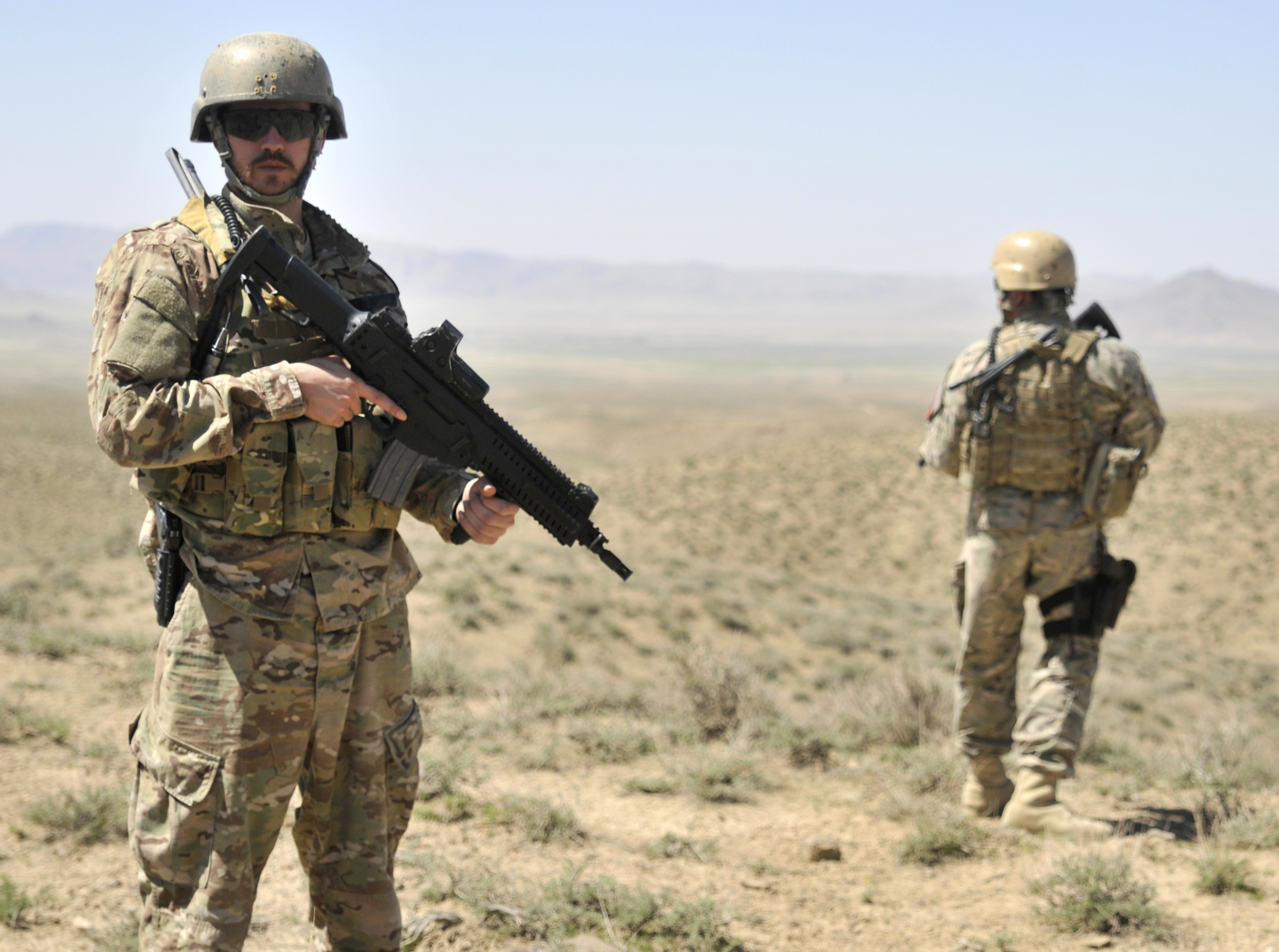
Albanian special forces in Afghanistan 2013 with the ARX160 SF

The Beretta ARX160 departs from the previously issued AR70/90 on several points. It is composed of an upper and lower receiver, both manufactured mostly from polymer, and operates through a short-stroke piston system. It is chambered in either 5.56×45mm NATO or 7.62×39mm cartridge. Feeding is through STANAG magazines for the 5.56×45mm NATO configuration and AK-47 or AKM magazines for the 7.62×39mm configuration. Other calibres, including 5.45×39mm and 6.8mm Remington SPC were planned.

It features an ambidextrous safety, magazine release (right side, left side, and "AK style" paddle), bolt release and charging handle. The rifle is equipped with Picatinny rails and a foldable telescopic stock. The rifle also possesses the ability to change which side spent casings are ejected, as well as a quick-change barrel which can be removed and replaced in seconds without any tools.

The lightweight barrel is chrome lined and manufactured by the hammer forging process at the Beretta factory in Gardone Val Trompia, Lombardy. Barrel lengths for this rifle are 16 in (40.6 cm) for its standard barrel, and a 12 in (30.48 cm) barrel for special operators. The flash hider has 5 radial cuts and 4 smaller cuts to control muzzle climb in automatic firing. Barrels have a 1:7 twist to fire NATO standard ball and tracer rounds. The non-free-floated barrel is easily removed simply by pulling on slide levers and pulling it out. The bayonet lug, designed by Beretta in association with Extrema Ratio for the Extrema Ratio Fulcrum E.I. bayonet is positioned above the barrel rather than underneath it.

However, on the ARX160 A3 the bayonet lug is repositioned under the barrel and it ditches the proprietary bayonet lug design meant for mounting the Extrema Ratio Fulcrum E.I. bayonet for a redesigned bayonet lug that is compatible with the M9 bayonet. On the ARX160 A3 issued to the Italian army the Extrema Ratio Fulcrum E.I. bayonet has been replaced by FKMD Oplita bayonet. The newly designed bayonet lug on the ARX160 A3 is also compatible with the existing Extrema Ratio Fulcrum Ranger bayonets that have always been the standard-issue bayonets of the Alpine Paratroopers. Thus it negates the need to switch over to the Extrema Ratio Fulcrum E.I. bayonets.

The ARX160 operating system is unique in that the piston moves almost 2 in (50.8 mm), while other systems move fractions of an inch. The piston follows the bolt carrier almost all the way rearward, resulting in low gas pressure levels and a less sudden and more constant push on the carrier group.

It has the ability to eject the empty shells out of either in the right side or left side for ambidextrous operation. The bolt has seven lugs and an extractor on the left and right, with no ejector. The extractors are spring-loaded and which way cases are ejected is selected by pressing a case through a small hole located past the port. It is small and optimised for the tip of a bullet to fit. The ejection port is open on both sides and directs shells at a 45-degree angle from the barrel. The cocking lever is on the bolt carrier and can be positioned on either side by pulling it out, swinging it through the ejection port, and pushing it in to secure it in place.

It features a standard back-up iron sights that are made of the same polymer as the weapon's receiver. The front sight post is adjustable for windage and elevation and the rear peep sight has six positions to fire in increments from 100 to 600 meters. The primary optical sight is the Aimpoint ACIES, a domestic version of the Aimpoint CompM2. Telescopic sights, night vision systems, vertical forward grips, and other accessories will be available through the Soldato Futuro program.

== Variants ==
=== ARX160 ===
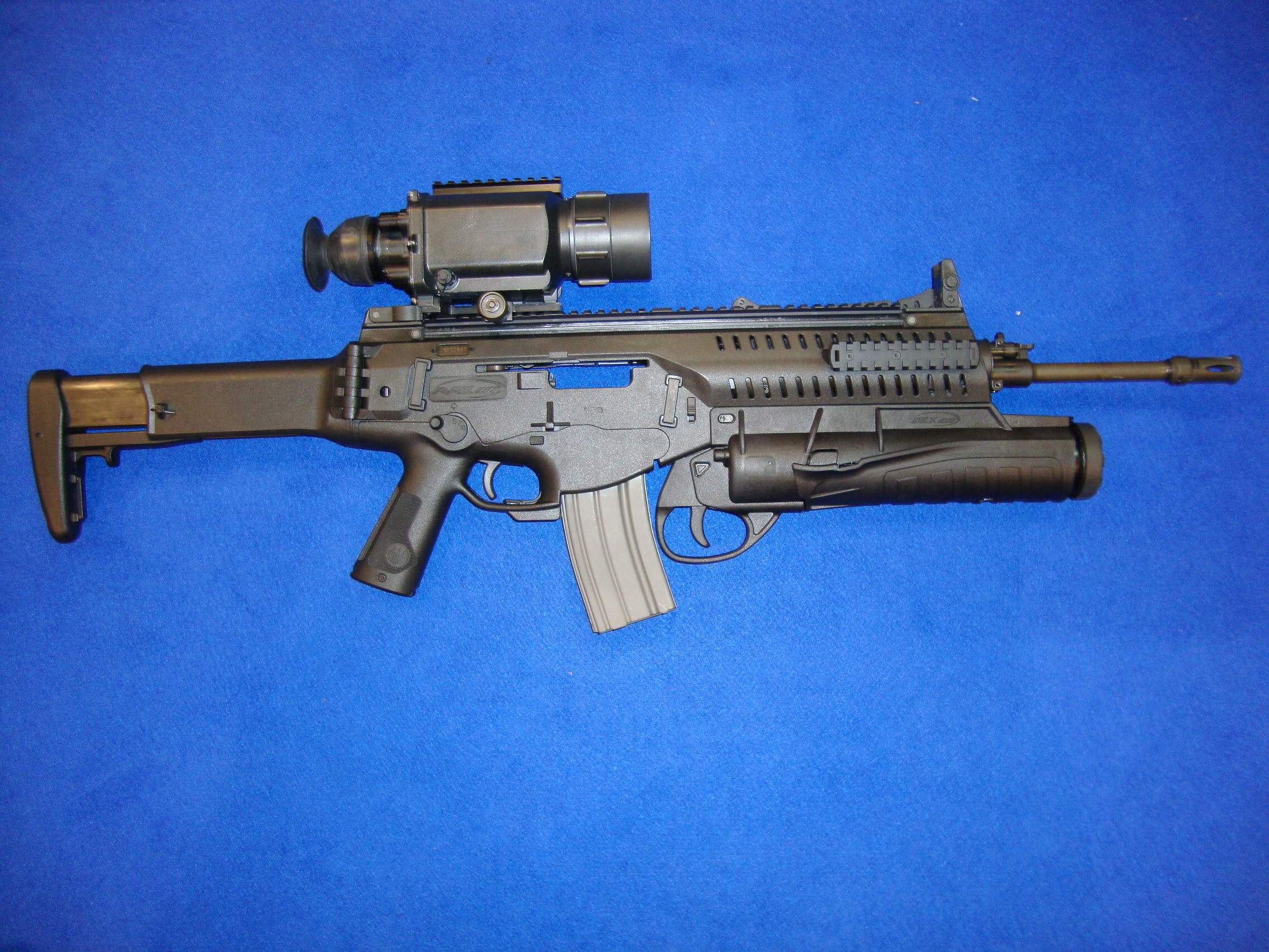
ARX160 equipped with a Qioptiq VIPIR thermal sight and GLX160 grenade launcher, and the bolt assembly in full rearward position

The Beretta ARX160 can be chambered in either 5.56×45mm NATO or 7.62×39mm cartridge. It features a Picatinny rail on the top of the receiver, and on the 3-,6-,9-o'clock position of the handguard for mounting various optics, grips and other accessories. The Picatinny rail that is located at the 6 o'clock position is limited, Beretta does offer an extended Picatinny rail accessory to mitigate this. It has a quick change barrel feature, a barrel length of 12- and 16-inch, a folding back-up iron sights, ambidextrous fire/safety selector, magazine release, bolt release and charging handle, case ejector that can eject the empty brass either to the right side or left side by pressing on the case ejection selector with a tip of a 5.56×45mm NATO cartridge, and a telescopic folding buttstock that is also adjustable for length of pull. A conversion kit for 7.62×39mm is also available, it requires changing the barrel, bolt, lower receiver assembly and magazine in order to change the calibre. It uses the AKM magazines for the 7.62×39mm configuration and STANAG magazines for the 5.56×45mm NATO configuration. It uses a proprietary bayonet lug that extends over the barrel from the gas block and is compatible with Extrema Ratio Fulcrum E.I. bayonet.

==== ARX160 SF ====
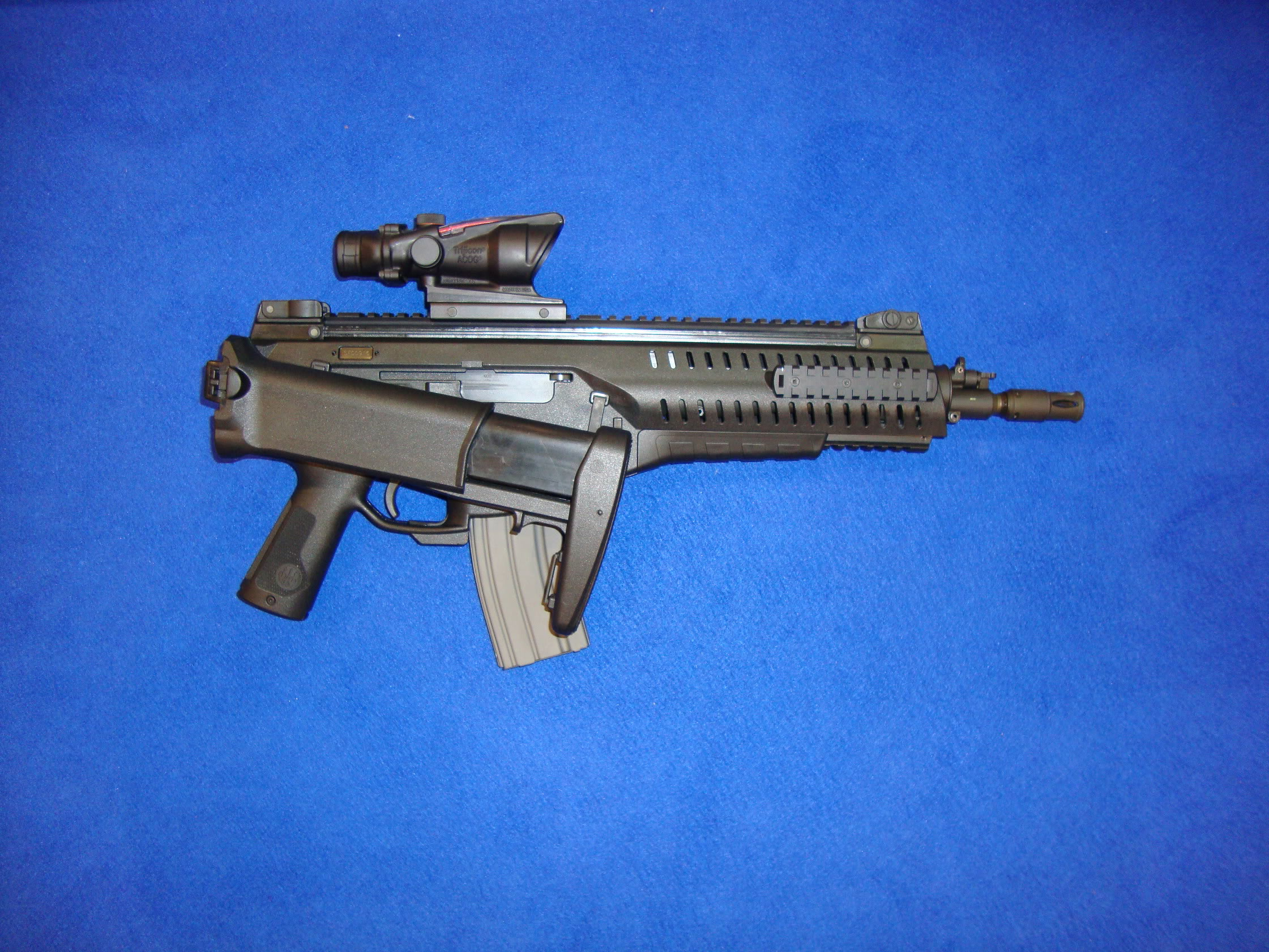
ARX160 A2 with an ACOG scope equipped, the buttstock folded, and the bolt assembly in full forward position

The Beretta ARX160 SF (Special Forces), also known as the ARX160 A2, is similar to the original design but features a shorter buttstock, an extended Picatinny rail on the bottom of its handguard and uses a 12-inch barrel. It was developed for the Italian special forces and was later adopted by them.

==== ARX160 A3 ====
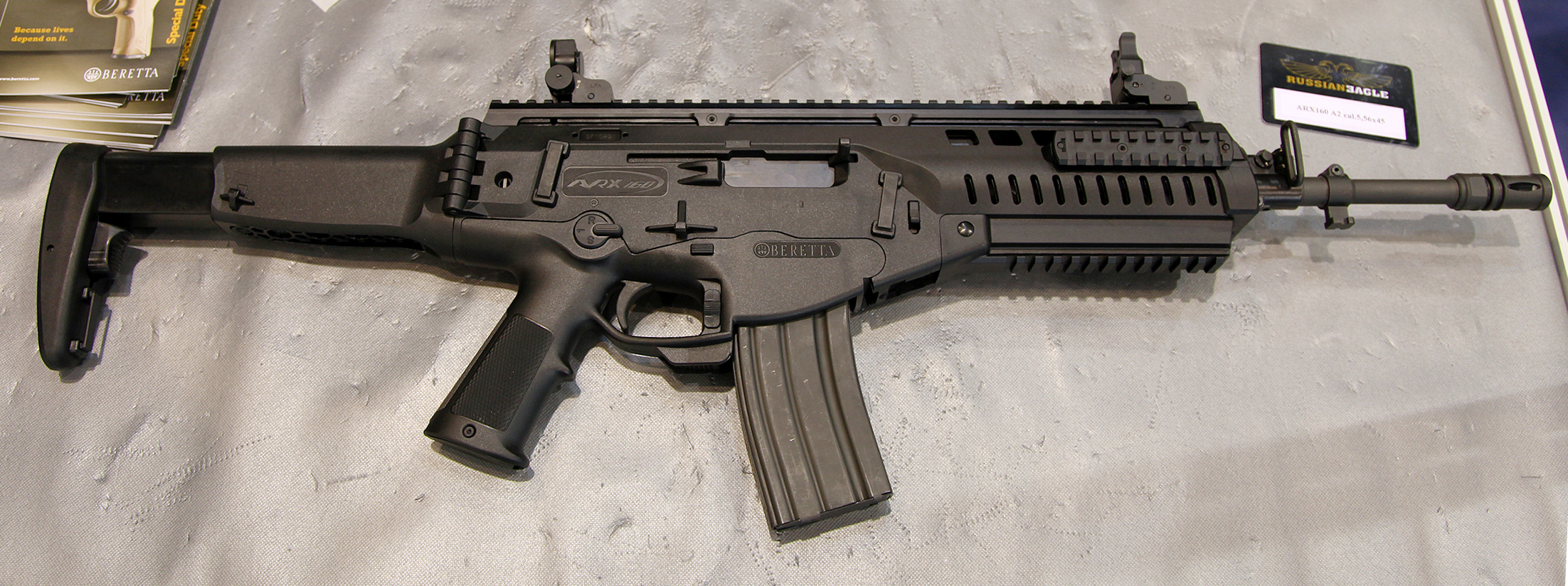
ARX160 A3 note the extended Picatinny rail accessory equipped on the redesigned handguard that has improved heat ventilation

The Beretta ARX160 A3 improves upon the original design of the ARX160. It features three different barrel lengths an 11-, 14-, and 16-inch. The changes includes a redesigned pistol grip, and handguard where its top row air vent slits have been replaced with a larger square cut outs, though the bottom row air vent still retains the thinner slits. These larger cut outs reduces some weight of the rifle while letting more air to circulate around the barrel. The bayonet lug on the ARX160 A3 is repositioned under the barrel and it ditches the proprietary bayonet lug design meant for mounting the Extrema Ratio Fulcrum E.I. bayonet for a re-designed bayonet lug that is compatible with the M9 bayonet. On the ARX160 A3 issued to the Italian army the Extrema Ratio Fulcrum E.I. bayonet has been replaced by the FKMD Oplita bayonet. The newly designed bayonet lug on the ARX160 A3 is also compatible with the existing Extrema Ratio Fulcrum Ranger bayonets that have always been the standard-issue bayonets of the Alpine Paratroopers. Thus it negates the need to switch over to the Extrema Ratio Fulcrum E.I. bayonets. As of late Beretta simply refers to the ARX160 A3 as the ARX160.

=== ARX100 ===
The Beretta ARX100 is a semi-automatic only variant intended for the civilian market. It features a Picatinny rail on the top of the receiver for mounting various optics, on both sides of the hand guard for mounting various accessories and on the bottom of the handguard for mounting various grips, a quick change barrel, a barrel length of 16 inch, a folding back-up iron sights, ambidextrous fire/safety selector, magazine release, bolt release and charging handle, a case ejector that can eject the empty brass either to the right side or left side by pressing on the case ejection selector with a tip of a 5.56×45mm NATO (.223 Remington) cartridge, and a telescopic folding buttstock that is also adjustable for length of pull. The ARX100 lacks bayonet lug, and still uses the old ARX160 handguard design. However, it does use the improved pistol grip from the ARX160 A3.

==== ARX160 22 LR ====
The Beretta ARX160 22 LR is a rimfire semi-automatic only variant, chambered in .22 Long Rifle cartridge. It features an 18.1-inch barrel for the carbine configuration and an 8.5-inch barrel for the pistol configuration and uses a 5-, 10-, 15- or 20-round magazine.

== ARX200 ==
In late 2015, Beretta introduced the ARX200 chambered in 7.62×51mm NATO cartridge. It operates through a short-stroke gas piston system with a rotating bolt, capable of fully automatic and semi-automatic fire. It has a cyclic rate of fire of around 700 rounds per minute.

The ARX200 is planned to fill the gap in Italian infantry armament between the 5.56×45mm NATO assault rifle and large-calibre bolt-action sniper rifles, based on combat experience in Afghanistan. The Italian Armed Forces has ordered four hundred ARX200s for trials and evaluation. It's also expected that the first batch of ARX200s will be delivered by the end of 2015. They are also testing on how to introduce a battle rifle into small infantry units. Possibly 2 to 3 designated marksman rifles and battle rifles are planned for use at squad level.

The Italian Army is planning to introduce two configurations of the ARX200; a battle rifle and a designated marksman rifle. The battle rifle configuration is to be equipped with an interface for the Beretta GLX160 grenade launcher chambered in 40×46mm NATO, a foldable telescopic stock with adjustable cheek rest, shock absorber back plate and four fixed sling attachments. On the other hand, the designated marksman rifle configuration is to be equipped with a fixed buttstock and a computerised Intelligent Combat Sight (ICS), developed by Steiner Optics (a subsidiary of Beretta Defense Technologies), which integrates a laser rangefinder, an inclinometer and a ballistic calculator into a compact 6×40 optic.

The ARX200 has three gas settings; normal, adverse and suppressed firing. It features a fully ambidextrous controls that include the bolt catch lever, magazine release button and fire selector. Unlike the ARX160, it lacks the capability to change which side the empty shells are ejected. However, the charging handle remains reversible and can be switched from the right- to left-side of the upper receiver and the barrel locking bolt is located in front of the magazine well. It is equipped with a quick-change, free-floating, cold hammer-forged barrel which can be removed and replaced in a minute using one wrench. It has a weight of 4.5 kg without a magazine and 8.6 lb (3.9 kg) unloaded, a length of 730 mm with the stock folded, 890 mm with the stock collapsed and 1,000 mm with the stock extended, a 406 mm (16 in) heavy barrel (excluding the flash hider) with match-grade rifling with four right-hand grooves and a 279 mm (11 in) twist rate, a monolithic upper receiver with a long Picatinny rail on top made of steel-reinforced polymer which includes internal rails for a weapon bolt carrier, a more streamlined forend for operators who use the C-clamp grip when shooting, and Beretta claims that it has an accuracy of 1.5 MOA with 5 shots at 100 metres. The polymer lower receiver is equipped with a modular magazine well for the new Beretta 20-round polymer magazine and also has a special magazine-well adapter that can be removed in order to use the M110/SR-25 magazines.

== Users ==
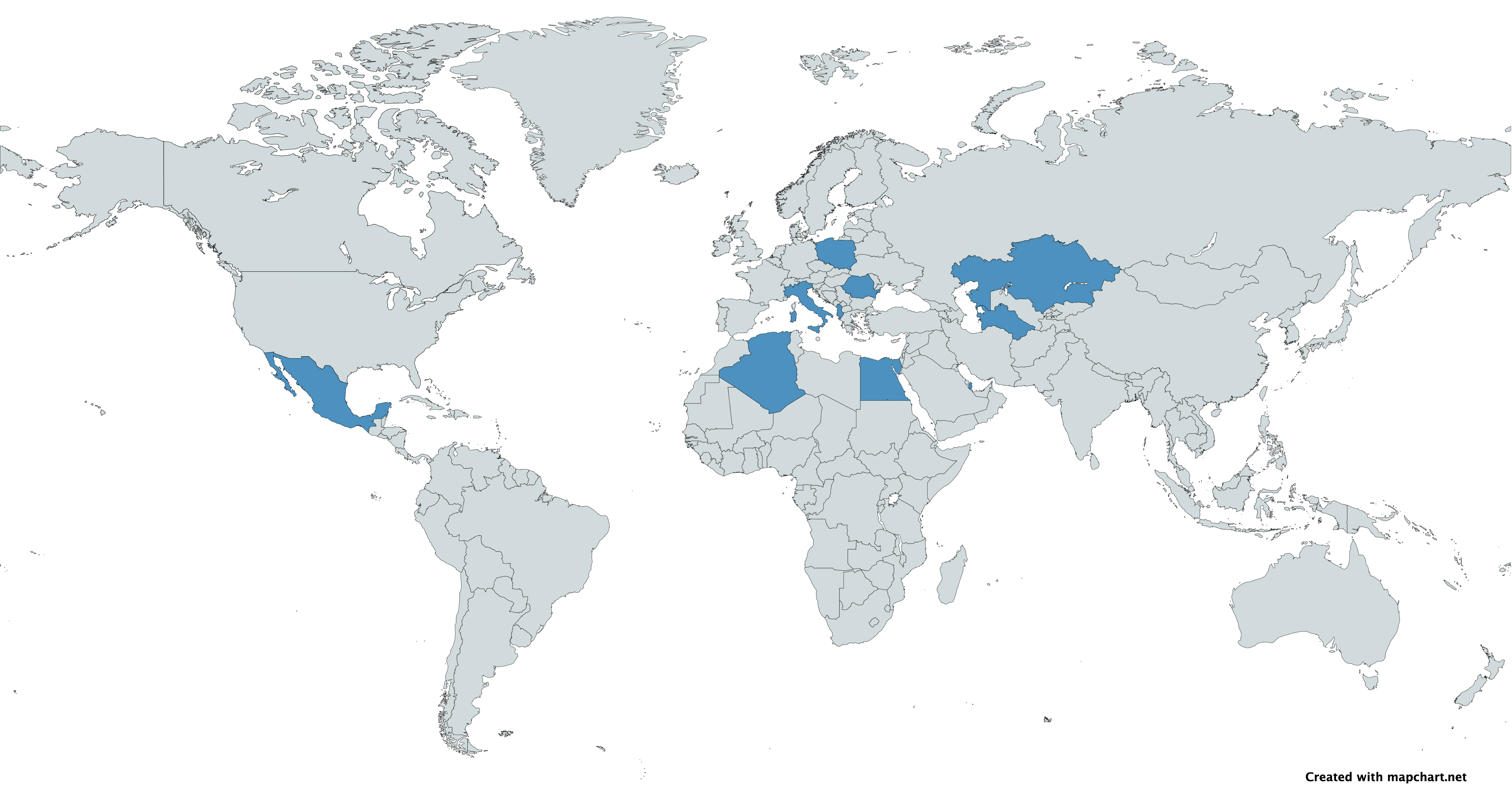
Map with Beretta ARX160 users in blue

- Albania: Used by the military police, Special Operations Battalion and special police forces (RENEA).
- Algeria: ARX160 in service in both 5.56×45mm and 7.62×39mm calibre used by the Algerian special forces and the presidential guard, beginning 2014.
- Azerbaijan: ARX160 in both 5.56×45mm and 7.62×39mm calibre used by Azerbaijani Special Forces.
- Brazil: One thousand ARX-200 used by the Military Police of São Paulo State, 300 ARX-200 bought by Military Police of Goiás State, and 120 rifles bought by Mato Grosso to equip both its military and Civil Police.
- Colombia: ARX-160 used by special operations and security forces of the Colombian Aerospace Force.
- Egypt: Used by the Sa'ka Forces and Navy special forces brigades.
- Indonesia: Qatari-made ARQ160 used by territorial development infantry battalions of the Indonesian Army. Beretta-made ARX160 used by Kopaska.
- Italy: Standard issue assault rifle of Carabinieri, Italian Army, Italian Navy, Italian Air Force
- Kazakhstan: Used by the Kazakhstan Special Forces in 7.62×39mm with the GLX160 grenade launcher.
- Iraqi Kurdistan: ARX160 in 5.56×45mm NATO and 7.62×39mm seen in use by the Kurdish Peshmerga in 2017.
- Malaysia: Used by Malaysian Armed Forces.
- Mexico: Used by the Federal Police and Policia Metropolitana de Guadalajara. Almost 5,687 as of November 2014.
- Poland: On order by Polish Prison Service.
- Qatar: At DIMDEX 2018 exhibition, Barzan Holding made an agreement with Beretta to create joint venture to locally produce the ARX160 and ARX200 for the Qatar Armed Forces; 30,000 ARX200 for Qatar.
- Romania: The Romanian Armed Forces have chosen the ARX160 A3 to replace the old PM md. 63 and PA md. 86 of the Romanian Land Forces.
- Russia: At least one Beretta ARX160 has been seen in use by the Russian Special Operations Forces.
- Turkmenistan: A total of 1,680 ARX160s along with 150 GLX160s used by the military; later, other furniture of ARX160 A3s. Standard issue, replacing the older AK-74.
- Ukraine: In use by the Ukrainian Armed Forces in limited quantity from weapon deliveries by Italy.
