= Iliria-class patrol vessel =

Albanian Coast Guard class

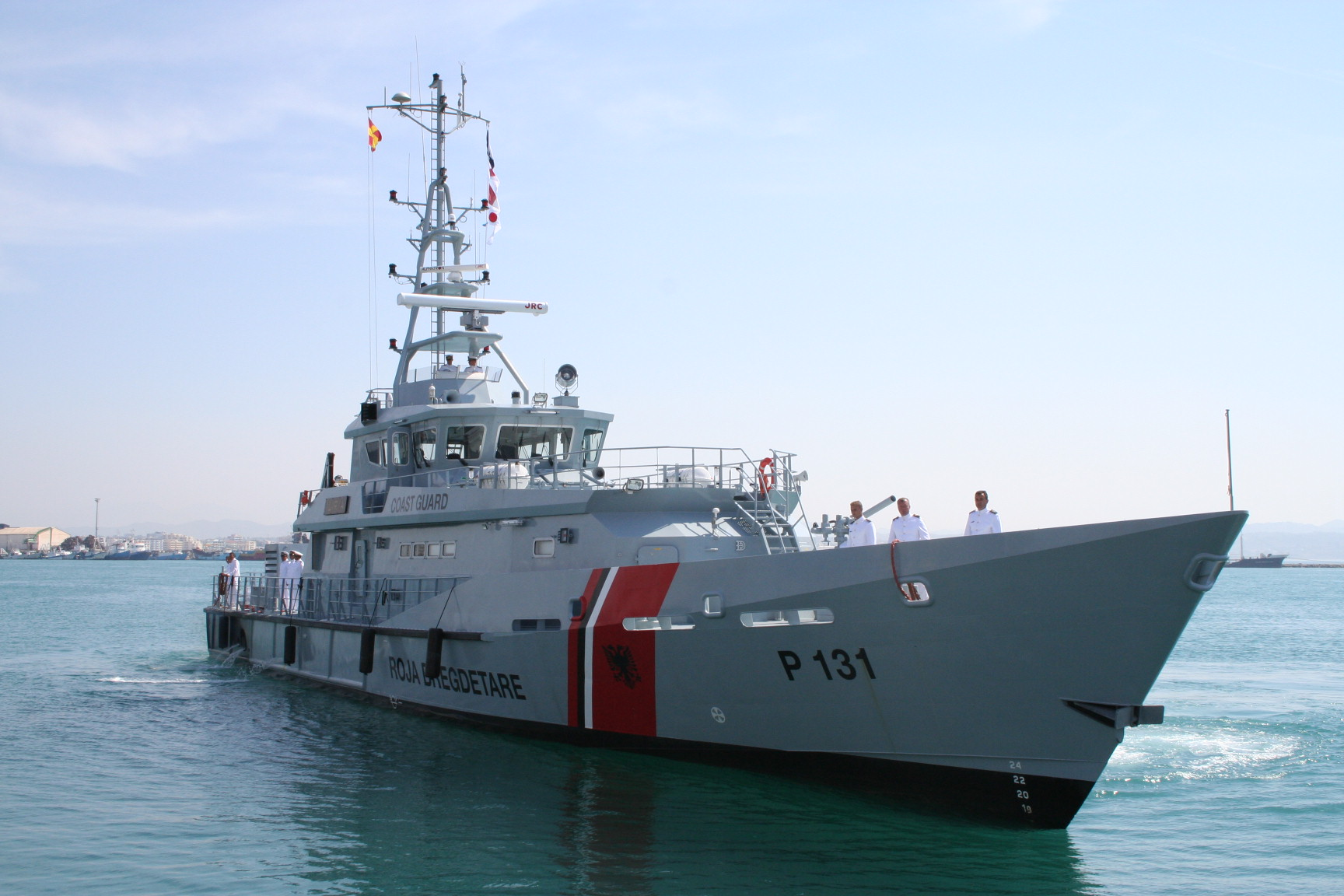
- Iliria-class patrol vessel of the Albanian Coast Guard

Class overview
- Name: Iliria-class
- Builders: Damen Group; Pashaliman Shipyard
- Operators: Albanian Coast Guard
- Built: 2007–2014
- In service: 2008–Present
- In commission: 2008–2014
- Completed: 4
- Active: 4

General characteristics
- Type: Patrol vessel
- Displacement: 208 t (205 long tons; 229 short tons)
- Length: 42.8 m (140 ft)
- Beam: 7.11 m (23.3 ft)
- Draft: 2.5 m (8 ft 2 in)
- Depth: 3.7 m (12 ft)
- Installed power: 4,700 kW (6,300 hp)
- Propulsion: 2x Caterpillar 3516B TA-HD/D
- Speed: 26 knots (48 km/h)
- Range: 2,450 nautical miles (4,540 km) at 12 knots (22 km/h)
- Endurance: 14 days
- Boats & landing craft carried: 1 × RHIB
- Complement: 4 officers, 16 crew
- Sensors & processing systems: JRC JMA5310-6 X-band; JRC JMA5310-12 S-band
- Armament: 1 × Nexter M621 NARWHAL 20 mm autocannon

Iliria-class patrol vessels is an Albanian Coast Guard class of patrol vessels, that is based on the Damen Stan 4207 patrol vessel design. The first ship of this class Iliria (P 131), from which the class takes its name, was produced in Gorinchem, Netherlands by Damen Group and was commissioned in 2008. The other three vessels were built locally starting from 2009 to 2014 in Albania by the state-owned Pashaliman Shipyard. Over a dozen navies, coast guards and other government agencies operate vessels based on this design. While some of those vessels are equipped for purely civilian patrols, the Albanian ships are armed with a remote-controlled 20mm Nexter M621 NARWHAL cannon.

== Design and construction ==
The class itself was built to the Damen Stan Patrol 4207 design by the Damen Shipyards in the Netherlands and has a steel hull with an aluminum superstructure. Much effort has been expended in making them quiet to reduce crew fatigue; their engines are raft-mounted, decks throughout the ships are of a floating type, and their compartments are constructed on a box-within-a-box principle.

A 7-meter (23 ft) rigid inflatable boat (RIB) can be launched from the stern slipway. They are fitted with a 2,000-litre (440 imp gal) per minute fire fighting system for dealing with fires in other ships.

== Procurement history ==
Even prior to the country's NATO accession, Albania was committed to the modernization of Navy fleets, both Navy and Coast Guard, since the old fleet was almost all out of service. In 2007 it signed a contract with the Damen Group for the completing of the Coast Guard with Patrol vessels to be used to perform a number of tasks and duties, including coastal patrols, search and rescue, control and monitoring of maritime traffic, marine environment protection. The contract envisaged the construction of 4 vessels based on the design of the Damen Stan 4207 patrol vessel, which the first of them would be built in Netherlands and 3 others in the Pashaliman Shipyard in Albania. The first patrol vessel, named Iliria, was built and delivered to the Albanian Coast Guard in August 2008. Enabling thus the following construction of 3 other patrol vessels in Pasha Liman Base by Albanian carpenters assisted by the experts of Damen Group. The second patrol vessel Oriku was commissioned in September 2011, the third ship, Lissus, was operational in 2012 and fourth Butrint in 2013.

== Vessels in class ==
The first of the class takes its name from Illyria. While each of the three patrol vessels build in Pashaliman Shipyard are named after the ancient Illyrian cities.

Iliria class
Name	Builder	Launched	In service	Status
Iliria	Damen Shipyard	2008	2008	Active
Oriku	Pashaliman Shipyard	2011	2011	Active
Lissus	Pashaliman Shipyard	2012	2012	Active
Butrinti	Pashaliman Shipyard	2014	2014	Active

== Service history ==
The main task for these vessels is to provide maritime security and the implementation of the maritime law in Albania's Adriatic and Ionian coasts. Secondary tasks are marine search and rescue, marine pollution control, and fisheries implementation off. The first vessel, Iliria, entered service in 2008 and the last, Butrinti in 2014. On November 21, 2016, Oriku became the first ship to represent Albania in an international mission within NATO, participating in mission SNMG2 in the Aegean Sea. On November 22 of the following year, she completed her mission leaving the place to her sister Butrinti. Both ships successfully completed their mission, often helping to save the lives of migrants trying to cross the border by water from Turkey to Greece.
