= Coast Guard (Albania) =

Maritime law enforcement force of Albania

Coast Guard of Albania Roja Bregdetare
- Official logo

- Jack

Agency overview
- Formed: 2002

Jurisdictional structure
- Operations jurisdiction: Albania
- Constituting instrument: Law no. 8875, 2002 on "Albanian Coast Guard".
- Specialist jurisdiction: Coastal patrol, marine border protection, marine search and rescue

Operational structure
- Parent agency: Ministry of Defence

Facilities
- Naval Bases: Durrës & Pasha Liman

The Albanian Coast Guard (Albanian: Roja Bregdetare) is the maritime law enforcement force of Albania. It is a paramilitary force which is under the authority of the Ministry of Defence and its operational duties in peacetime are organized and commanded by the Inter-Institutional Operational Maritime Center (QNOD). The Coast Guard has the responsibility for the security of Albanian territorial waters, maritime surveillance and law enforcement, as well as search and rescue. In operational combat situations in peacetime or wartime, the direction and command of the Albanian Coast Guard passes to military authorities and Albanian Naval Force.

Since November 21, 2016, Albanian Coast Guard joined the SNMG2 in Aegean Sea, as NATO member state.

== History ==
The Albanian Coast Guard was established in 2002, following the ratification by the parliament of the relevant law No. 8875, dated 4 April 2002 "on Coast Guard". The Coast Guard was equipped with 6 patrol vessels 200 Class Super Speranza, donated by Italian Coast Guard, which joined the three Seaspectre Mk III and the two 45' PCC Class, donated by US Coast Guard in 1999–2001. In August of the same year, 14 vessels of the Navy and the Coast Guard participated in the extensive trafficking operation "Puma", in cooperation with the law enforcement agencies, anti-smuggling, fisheries, etc., which successfully made possible the blocking of the maritime traffic between Albania and Italy.

In 2004, the Coast Guard receives as a donation 6 other patrol vessels, also from the Italian Coast Guard. This time they were 2000 Class patrol vessel.

=== Damen Stan 4207 patrol vessels ===
Even prior to the country's NATO accession, Albania was committed to the modernization of Navy fleets, both Navy and Coast Guard, since the old fleet was almost all out of service. In 2007, was signed a contracts with the Damen Group for the completing of the Coast Guard with Patrol vessels to be used to perform a number of tasks and duties, including coastal patrols, search and rescue, control and monitoring of maritime traffic, marine environment protection. The contract envisaged the construction of 4 vessels of the Damen Stan 4207 class, which the first of them would be built in Netherlands and 3 others in the Pasha Liman naval base in Albania. The first patrol vessel, named Iliria P-131, was built and delivered to the Albanian Coast Guard in August 2008. Enabling thus the following construction of 3 other patrol vessels in Pasha Liman Base by Albanian carpenters assisted by the experts of Damen Group. The second patrol vessel Oriku P-132 will be commissioned in September 2011, the third ship, Lisus P-133, will be operational in 2012 and fourth Butrint P-134 in 2013.

== Missions ==
The missions of the Albanian Coast Guard include:

- Search and rescue
- Maritime law enforcement
- Protection of marine resources
- Safety of navigation
- Fisheries protection and regulation

== See also ==
- Albanian Naval Force
