= Albanian Naval Force =

Albanian Naval Forces
- Forca Detare
- Founded: 1925; 101 years ago
- Country: Albania
- Type: Navy
- Part of: Albanian Armed Forces
- Anniversaries: 25 December – Navy's Foundation Day

Commanders
- Chief of the General Staff: Lieutenant General Arben Kingji
- Commander of the Naval Force: Counter Admiral Arsen Mullaj

Insignia
- Naval ensign

- Ceremonial flag

The Albanian Naval Force (Albanian: Forca Detare të Republikës së Shqipërisë) is the naval branch of the Albanian military. Their name was changed from the Albanian Naval Defense Forces in 2010. The Naval Force is headquartered in Durrës, and operates multiple bases, including Kepi i Palit base in Durrës, and Pashaliman in Vlorë.

The vessels of the Albanian Naval Force are mostly patrol craft and support craft. The Naval Force operates four large Damen Stan Type 4207 patrol boats, three of which were built in Albania. Some of the Naval Force's vessels were purchased from, or donated by Italy, the United States, China, or the Soviet Union. Most former Soviet or Chinese boats have been retired from service; only one Soviet-built minesweeper remains in service.

The Naval Force performs mainly duties, based on the concept of "one Force, two Missions". The legal framework has been updated in order to facilitate these missions and EU-NATO integration. The Naval Force is also responsible for aids to navigation, including lighthouses.

== History ==
=== Early history ===
The history of the Albanian navy dates back to the General Command of Military Powers in 1925, following the creation of the Albanian Republic. Earlier efforts to create an Albanian naval force following Albanian independence in 1912 failed due to the start of World War I. In this period Albania possessed few naval vessels. Following the establishment of the Albanian Kingdom by King Zog in 1928, the navy was reformed into the Royal Albanian Navy.

Following the Italian invasion of Albania, the Albanian Armed Forces were abolished and many ships were destroyed in the harbors of Albania.

=== During the Socialist Era ===
The early history of the People's Socialist Republic of Albania saw Albania recovering from the result of Italian occupation and World War II. In 1945, a shipyard was built in Durrës to repair Albania's remaining ships.

In the mid-1950s Albania began to modernize and expand its navy. In 1954, a torpedo boat unit and the associated facility was established on Sazan Island, off the coast of Vlorë. A submarine unit was established in 1958. A naval academy was opened in Vlorë in 1961.

The Albanian Navy, as of 1986, operated around 50 small warships and 12 service vessels, with a workforce of approximately 3,200. Their largest combatants were a couple of ex-Soviet Whiskey-class submarines, although these were primarily out of service due to a shortage of spare parts. An additional Whiskey was utilized as a battery charging station or, according to some sources, as a harbor training boat. The offensive power of the navy was derived from six Shanghai-II-class gunboats and 32 45-ton Huchuan-class hydrofoil torpedo boats. Antisubmarine capability was limited to two aged ex-Soviet Kronstadt-class submarine chasers of 330 tons.

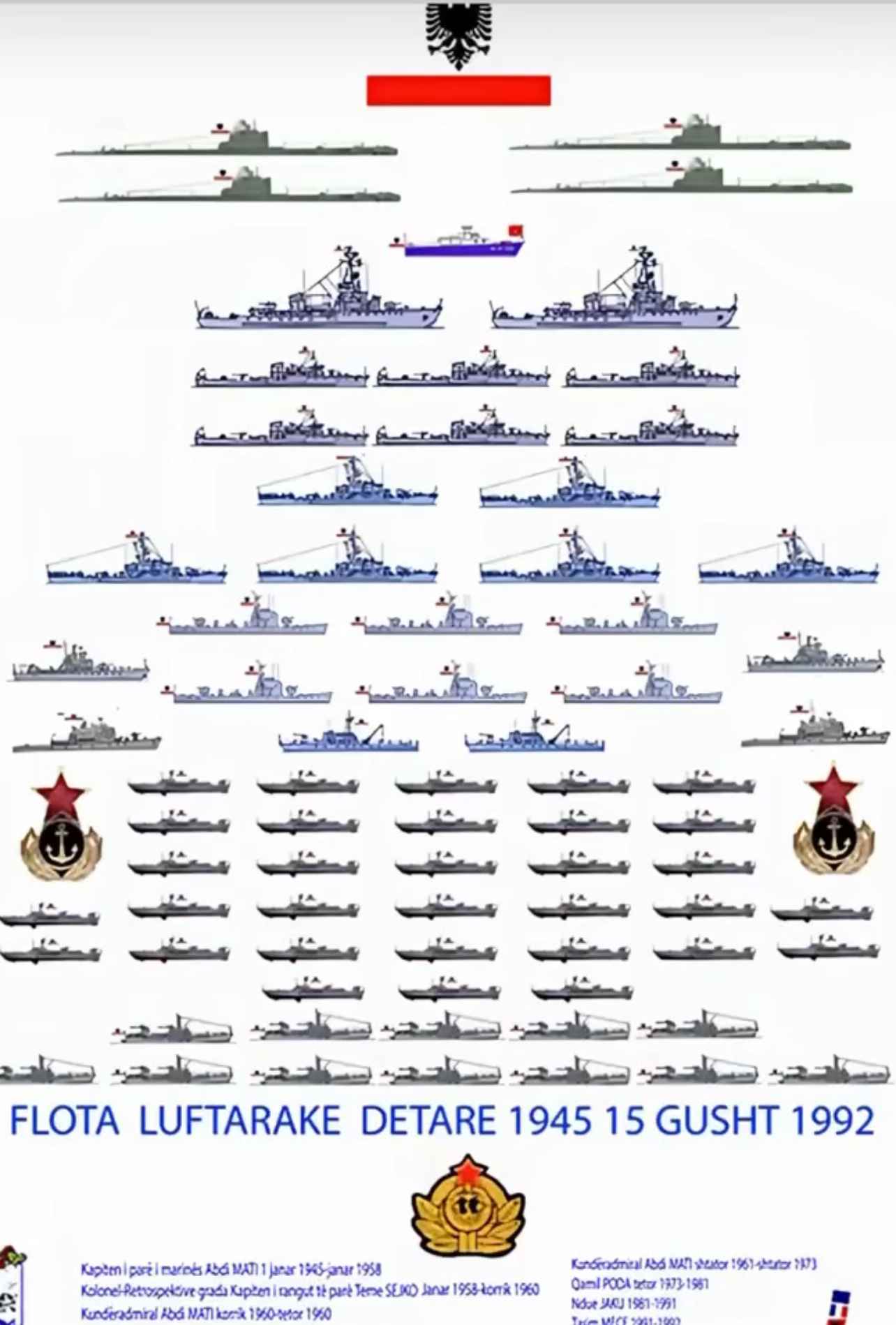
Albanian People's Navy Fleet 1945-1992

In terms of mine warfare, the navy had two ex-Soviet T-43-class ocean minesweepers and six T-301-class inshore minesweepers, all held in reserve. Only two T-301s have been (barely) operational since 1979. The auxiliary force comprised an ex-Soviet Khobi-class coastal tanker and a Toplivo-class yard tanker. There was no naval aviation or coastal defense capability. Nevertheless, the Albanian Army had three artillery battalions safeguarding the entrances to naval bases and several commercial ports at that time.

The largest of the fleet were four Soviet-built Whiskey-class submarines, a direct result of an Albanian-Soviet dispute over their ownership, after Albania withdrew from the Warsaw Pact (1961) and the Soviets abandoned the Pasha Liman Base. The submarines were put into full service thanks to Chinese assistance, but by the end of the 1980s their efficiency was in doubt due to Albanian isolation and the end of Chinese help.

Naval ensigns (1946–1992)

Naval Ensign (1946–1954)

Naval Ensign (1954–1958)

Naval Ensign (1958–1992)
Other ensigns (1946–1992)

State Ensign (1958–1992)

Coast Guard Ensign (1958–1992)

=== Recent history ===
The collapse of the People's Socialist Republic of Albania began in the early 1990s and was finalized with the 1992 elections and the founding of the 4th Albanian Republic. The fall of communism in Albania ushered in a new era of cooperation between the navies of Albania and other European nations. Starting in the 1990s, Albania began to take part in numerous search and rescue exercises alongside other European nations.

Vessels of the Albanian navy were seriously damaged during the 1997 political conflict. In March 1998, the Albanian Navy docked in Italy for repair and refuge. The Naval Force's facilities were also damaged in the conflict and repairs were made with the help of the United States, Italy, Germany, Greece, Turkey, and other countries. In the same year, Albania retired its four Whiskey-class submarines.

As a result of numerous agreements made between 1998 and 2004, Albania received donated patrol vessels from the United States and Italy for use in search and rescue operations. The United States donated five boats in 1998, Italy donated six boats in 2002, and Italy donated another five in 2004. In 2004, Albania entered into an agreement with Italy wherein the Italian Navy provided equipment and technical assistance to the Albanian Naval Force in order to upgrade the country's aids to navigation.

In June 2007, Albania renamed and reorganised its navy. The newly named Naval Force was thereafter organised into two flotillas and a logistics battalion.

== Facilities ==
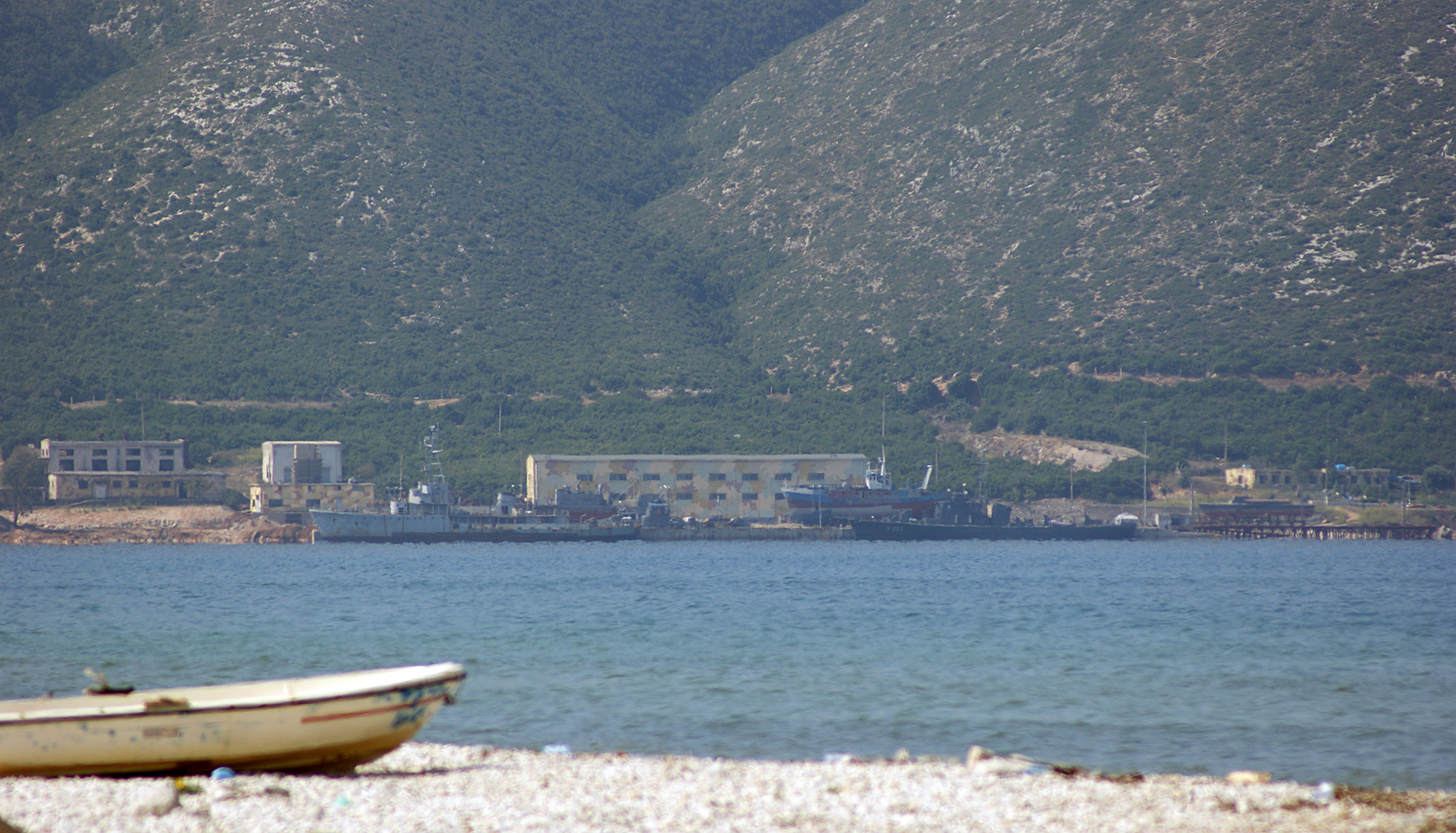
Pashaliman base from across the Bay of Vlorë

The Naval Force operates multiple bases, including Kepi i Palit base in Durrës, and Pashaliman in Vlorë. In the past, the Naval Force operated additional facilities including Porto Palermo, outside of Himarë, a submarine base on Sazan Island, and a base in Shëngjin.

=== Pashaliman ===
Pashaliman Naval Base, located near Vlorë, has been used by the Albanian Navy from the 1950s. In that time it was one of few naval bases in the Mediterranean. Currently, four retired Whiskey-class submarines previously owned by the Soviet Union are still located on the facility alongside Albania's active-duty naval vessels. Three of the Albanian Navy's four Illiria-class patrol vessels were built at Pashaliman, the most recent completed in 2014.

The Naval Force often operates naval exercises in the Bay of Vlorë, out of Pashaliman. The most recent exercise was in April 2016.

A civilian naval engineering firm and shipyard also operate out of the military facility at Pashaliman.

=== Porto Palermo ===
The Albanian Navy previously operated a submarine bunker called Porto Palermo, which was shut down after the decommissioning of Albania's submarines. In recent years, Porto Palermo has been used as the site of training exercises with foreign militaries, including a joint exercise with the United Kingdom.

== Structure ==
- Albanian Naval Force, in Durrës
  - Staff Support Company, in Durrës
  - Northern Naval District, at Kepi Palit in Durrës
    - Kepi Palit Naval Flotilla, at Kepi Palit Base
  - Southern Naval District, at Pasha Liman Base in Vlorë
    - Pasha Liman Naval Flotilla, at Pasha Liman Base in Vlorë
      - 4 × Stan 4207 patrol vessels: P 131 Iliria and P 133 Lisus in Durrës, P 132 Oriku and P 134 Butrinti
  - Maritime Surveillance Center, in Durrës
  - Diving Center, at Pasha Liman Base in Vlorë
  - Naval Basic Training Center, in Durrës
  - Hydrographic Service, in Durrës

=== Officer ranks ===
NATO code	OF-10	OF-9	OF-8	OF-7	OF-6	OF-5	OF-4	OF-3	OF-2	OF-1
Albanian Naval Force
Albanian Naval Force			Admiral	Nënadmiral	Kundëradmiral	Kapiten rangut I	Kapiten rangut II	Kapiten rangut III	Kapiten lejtnant	Lejtnant	Nënlejtnant

=== Other ranks ===
NATO code	OR-9	OR-8	OR-7	OR-6	OR-5	OR-4	OR-3	OR-2	OR-1
Albanian Naval Force
Albanian Naval Force	Kryekapter	Kapter	Rreshter	Tetar	Nëntetar	Ushtar IV	Ushtar III	Ushtar II	Ushtar I

== Equipment ==
=== Naval Force ===
Class	Type	Origin	Ship	Image	Details
Corvettes
Cassiopea-class patrol vessel	Patrol boat but Classed as a Corvette in Albanian Service	Italy	Libra (P 133)		Albanian Prime Minister Edi Rama announced the takeover of new warships on Saturday April 5th 2025. The main armament of the "Cassiopea" is a single Oto-Melara 76/62 Allargato gun, with weapons and fire control systems used by decommissioned Rizzo/Bergamini-class frigates. It is now learned that this ship will be a corvette type, "Cassiopeia", of the Italian Navy. Its delivery is in the process, expected in the coming days. This brand of warship is equipped militarily and with tasks mainly in maritime defense and surveillance. It is expected that this ship, after a general service and overhaul, will be active in service for up to the next 15 years.The main armament of ships of this class is a single Oto-Melara 76/62 Allargato gun with Coaxial Oerlikon KBA 25mm autocannons, with weapons and fire control systems used from the decommissioned Rizzo/Bergamini-class frigates. The ships have a flight deck and a hangar to accommodate a helicopter. The delivery of the ship will take place in a ceremony, which is expected to be attended by the Italian Minister of Defense, Guido Crosetto. The corvette is expected to be delivered under the company of the pride of the Italian Navy, 'Amerigo Vespucci'.
Anti-Pollution Vessels
Siman C 1297		Italy	Rodoni Y 31 Karaburuni Y 32		
Coastal patrol vessels
Iliria-class	Patrol vessel	Netherlands Albania	Iliria Oriku Lissus Butrinti		On November 13, 2007, a contract was signed with Damen Shipyards for four Stan Patrol 4207 offshore patrol vessels. The first was built in The Netherlands while the remaining three were built locally in Pashaliman Shipyard in Vlorë. It has full load displacement of 208t and total speed of 26 knots. All four vessels are armed with a remote-controlled 20mm Nexter M621 NARWHAL turret.
Cavallari-class patrol boat	Patrol vessel	Italy	CP400 CP400		Two patrol ships as a gift to Albania from Italy to enforce the protocol for migrants. After the Libra ship, two more are coming. The "gift" is contained in an amendment signed by representative Sara Kelany, head of the immigration department of Fratelli d'Italia.
Type 227	Patrol boat	Italy	R 123 R 124 R 225 R 226		Built in the years 1966–1969 in Italy. They were transferred from the Italian Coast Guard to the Albanian Coast Guard in 2002. Since then they have served as patrol boats during the summer season and the high tourist flow on the beaches. It has full load displacement of 16t and total speed of 24 knots.
2000-class	Patrol & Training boat	Italy	R 125 R 126 R 127 R 128 R 224 R 227 R 228		
5000-class	Patrol boat	Italy	8 boats		Transferred from Italian Guardia di Finanza in 2006. Since then they have been used by the Coast Guard to fight migrant or drug trafficking to Europe. It has 28t full load displacements.
Sea Spectre	Patrol Boat	United States	R 215 R 216 R 118		Transferred from the US to the Albanian Coast Guard on February 27, 1999.
PCC-class	Patrol boat	United States	R 117 R 217		They were transferred from the US to the Albanian Coast Guard on February 27, 1999. They are equipped with 12.7mm machine guns. It has full load displacement of 18t and total speed of 34 knots.
Rigid Inflatable Boat	Patrol boat	United Arab Emirates	9.5 m RIBs 7.5 m RIBs 4.7 m inflatable boats		In 2023, the Albanian Ministry of Defence received 13 boats from UAE manufacturer ASIS Boats — including two 9.5 m RIBs, four 7.5 m RIBs, and seven 4.7 m inflatable boats.
Archangel Patrol Boat	Patrol boat	United States	Archangel		USA gave 3 RM-B to albania in 2010 and 2 more in 2013 Albania uses these RM-B patrol boats as Archangel Patrol Boats.

=== Naval Armaments ===
Name	Type	Origin	Image	No.	Details
Naval Artillery
OTO Melara 76mm/L62 Allargato	76mm Naval Artillery	Italy		1	Main armament of the Cassiopea-class Patrol Vessel
Machine Guns and Autocannons
OTO Melara 25/80 w/Oerlikon KBA	25mm Autocannon	Italy Switzerland		2	Coaxial Autocannons of the Cassiopea-class Patrol Vessel
M621 NARWHAL	20mm Autocannon	France		4	Mounted on Iliria-class patrol vessels
DShKM	12.7x108mm Heavy Machine Gun	Albania		10	Mounted on PCC-class and Sea Spectre Patrol Vessels

== See also ==
- List of navies
- Albanian Armed Forces
- Albanian Army
- Albanian Air Force
- Albanian Hydrographic Service

== Sources ==
- Wertheim, Eric. The Naval Institute Guide to Combat Fleets of the World, 2005–2006; Their Ships, Aircraft, and Systems. US Naval Institute Press. Annapolis, Maryland. 2005.
- Jane's Fighting Ships 2005–2006, Jane's Information Group, ISBN 0-7106-2692-4
- The Military Balance 2008, The International Institute for Strategic Studies, ISBN 978-1-85743-461-3
