= Bay of Porto Palermo =

Bay and a tourist attraction in Southern Albania

Porto Palermo
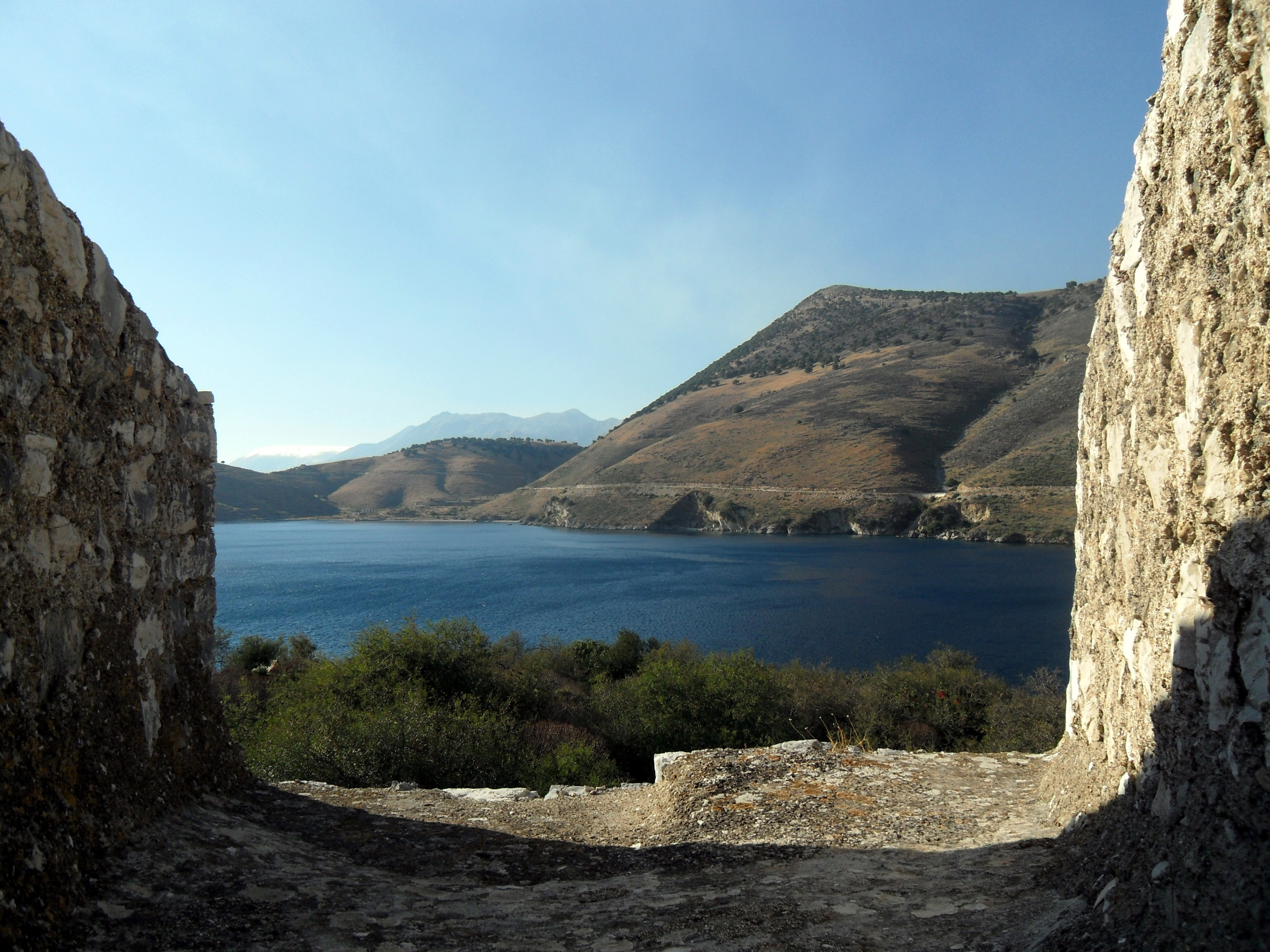
- View from Porto Palermo Castle

- Location within Albania
- Location: Vlorë County, Albania
- Coordinates: 40°3′36″N 19°47′6″E
- Type: Bay

The Porto Palermo (Albanian: Gjiri i Panormës or Gjiri i Palermos) is a bay in southwestern Albania. In the middle of the bay there is a small peninsula, it connection to the mainland serves as a parking space for campers and it has sandy beach.

== Porto Palermo fortress ==
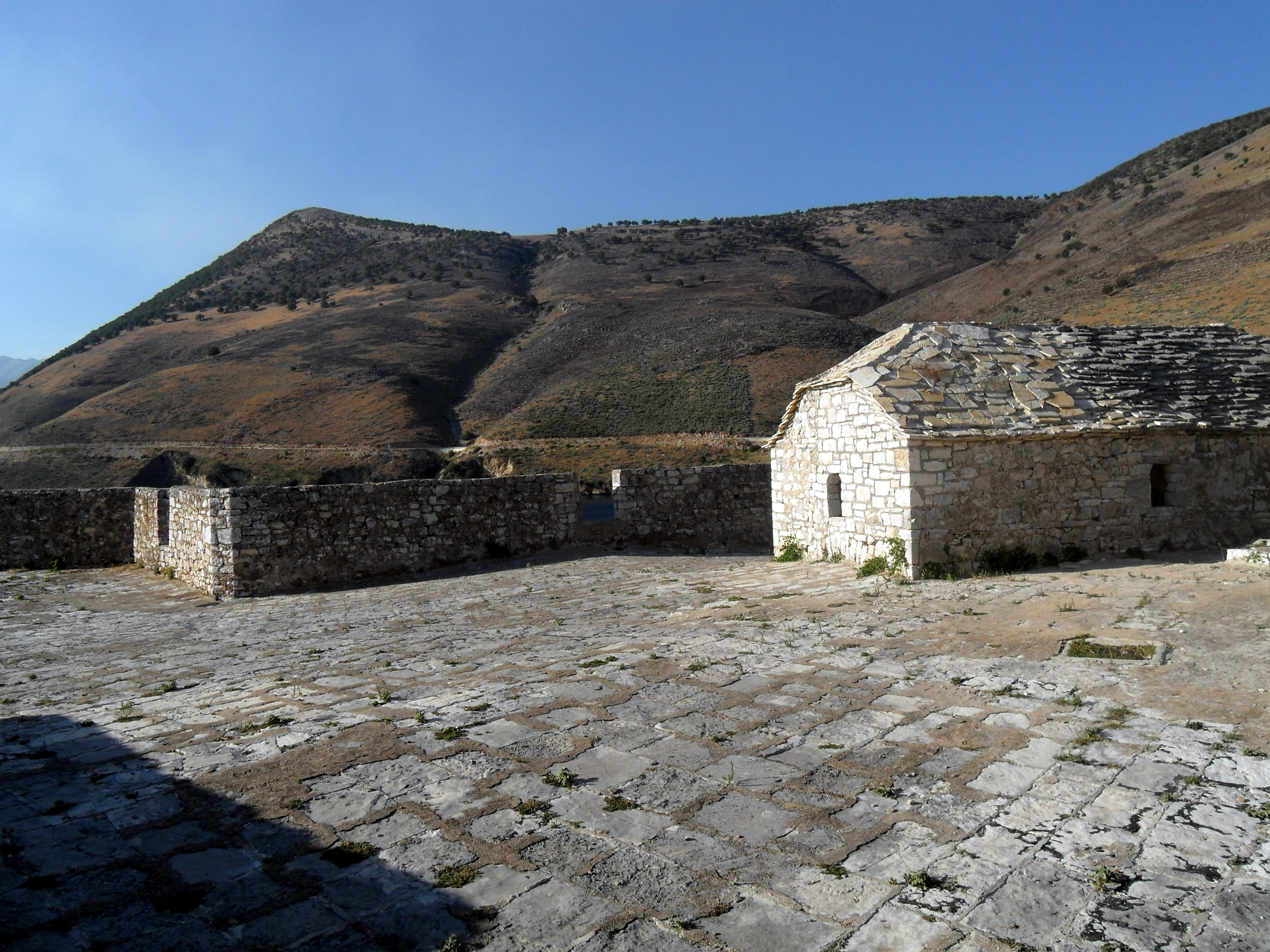
On the roof of the fortress

On the peninsula is a well-preserved old fortress, the Kalaja e Porto Palermos (Porto Palermo Castle). The complex with a triangular ground plan and three round corner bastions is similar to the Venetian Triangular Castle in Butrint. It was once located in a restricted military area and was still used by the Albanian military during the communist times. Today the fortress is accessible for a small fee and can be explored. The dark vaults lead to the roof, from where you have a good view of the bay.

The history of its origins and construction is not entirely clear. Mostly it is said that the fortress was built at the beginning of the 19th century by Ali Pasha of Ioannina when he declared the independence of his Eyalet from Ioannina and the Ottoman Empire. Ali Pasha had fortresses built and renovated in the entire south of what is now Albania. The triangular Venetian fortress built on the Channel of Vivari in Butrint is said to have served as a model for Porto Palermo. Fortifications already existed before.

Perhaps there was already a Venetian fortification, which at the same time as the one in Butrint before the advent of the Bastion systems was built in the fortress. It is said that in 1662 the Turks modernized an existing fortress in Porto Palermo or built a new fortress in Porto Palermo. The facility was primarily used to control the local population in the greater Himarë area, who had repeatedly revolted against the Turks.

Like the Souliotes, the inhabitants of Himara fought against Ali Pasha of Ioannina around 1800, who sometimes oppressed them in a very bloody way. The construction activities at the fortress of Porto also took place during this period Palermo. As a result, the region became quiet. In 1803, Ali Pasha offered the port and the fortress, which at that time only had four or five guns, to the British Royal Navy.

== Submarine base and bunker ==
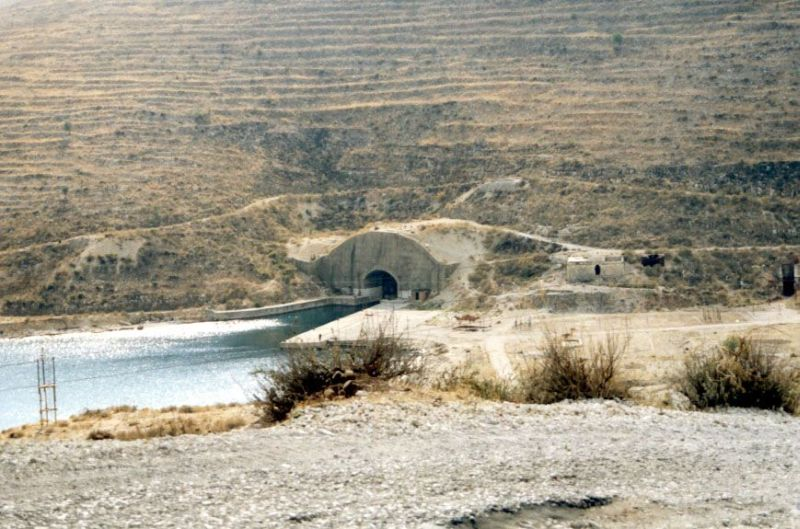
Entrance to the U-boat bunker

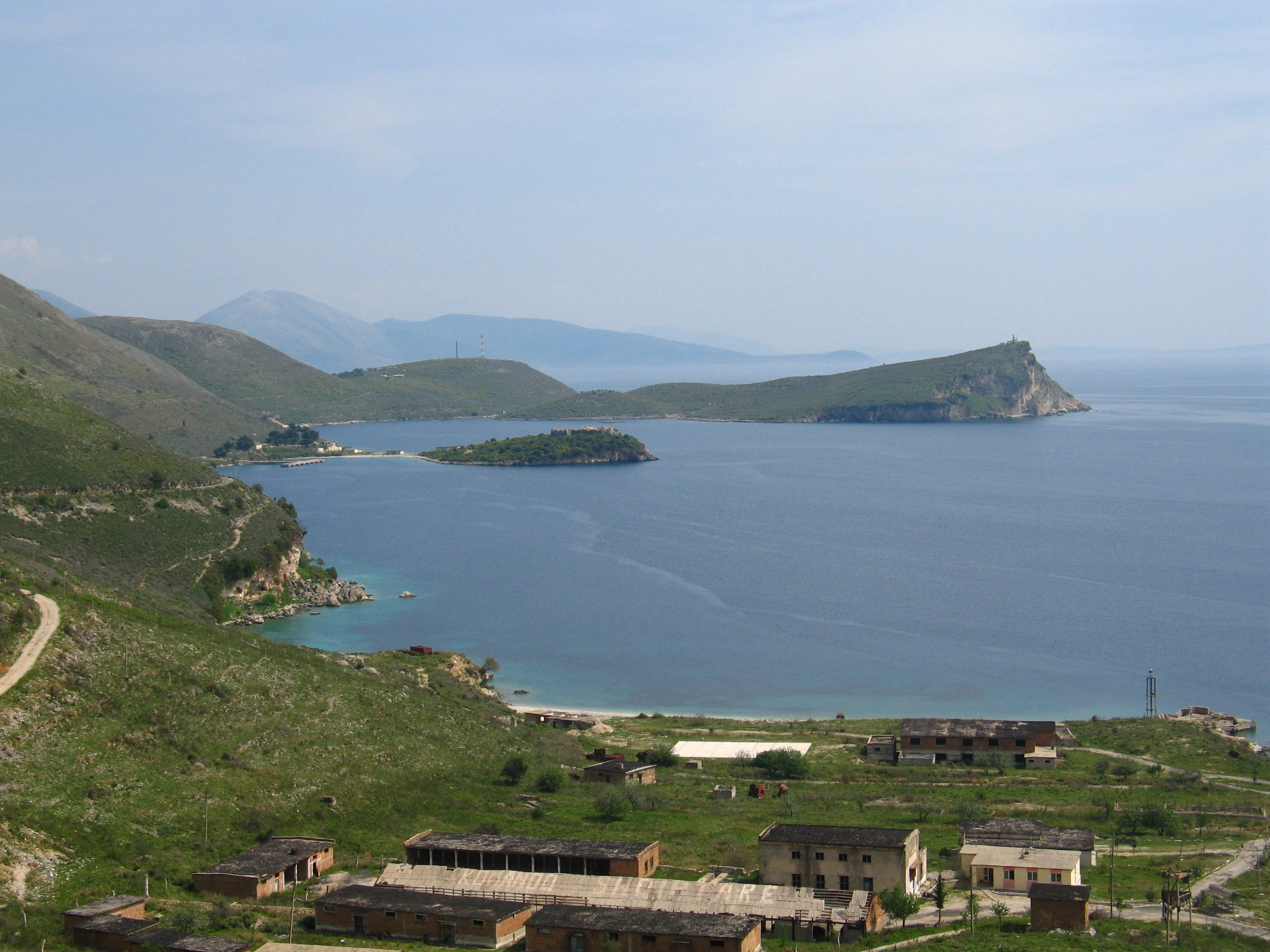
View of military base and bay from the north.

At the northern end of the bay of Porto Palermo there is a former submarine - base of the Albanian Naval Force with a well blown into the mountain, from the castle and the coastal road visible submarine pen. The complex cannot be seen from the sea. The base is practically unused today, but is still owned by the navy, which has two small patrol boats stationed there, and is therefore a restricted military area.

Porto Palermo was an important base of the Albanian navy during the rule of Enver Hoxha. After the establishment of the Warsaw Pact in 1955, of which Albania was a founding member, the Soviet Union stationed twelve of the Whiskey-class submarines in the Pasha Liman Base at the southwest end of the bay of Vlora. As the Soviet Union 1960/61 ended its military presence in Albania at the request of Hoxha, Hoxha took four of the boats ( S-241 , S-242 , S-358 , S-360 ) to, who drove with Albanian crews. Albania then leaned on China, and with Chinese help one began in the late 1960s with the construction of the submarine tunnel in Porto Palermo. However, China soon withdrew from the joint venture, so that Albania completed the construction on its own at enormous cost. The tunnel is more than 650 meters long and 12 meters high and provided space for four 75 meter long submarines of the Whiskey Class. Inside were all the necessary supply systems.

The associated barracks are now largely empty and in a rather neglected condition. Even the fence is hardly in place. Nothing is known about the condition inside the submarine bunker.
