= Albanian patrol vessel Lissus =

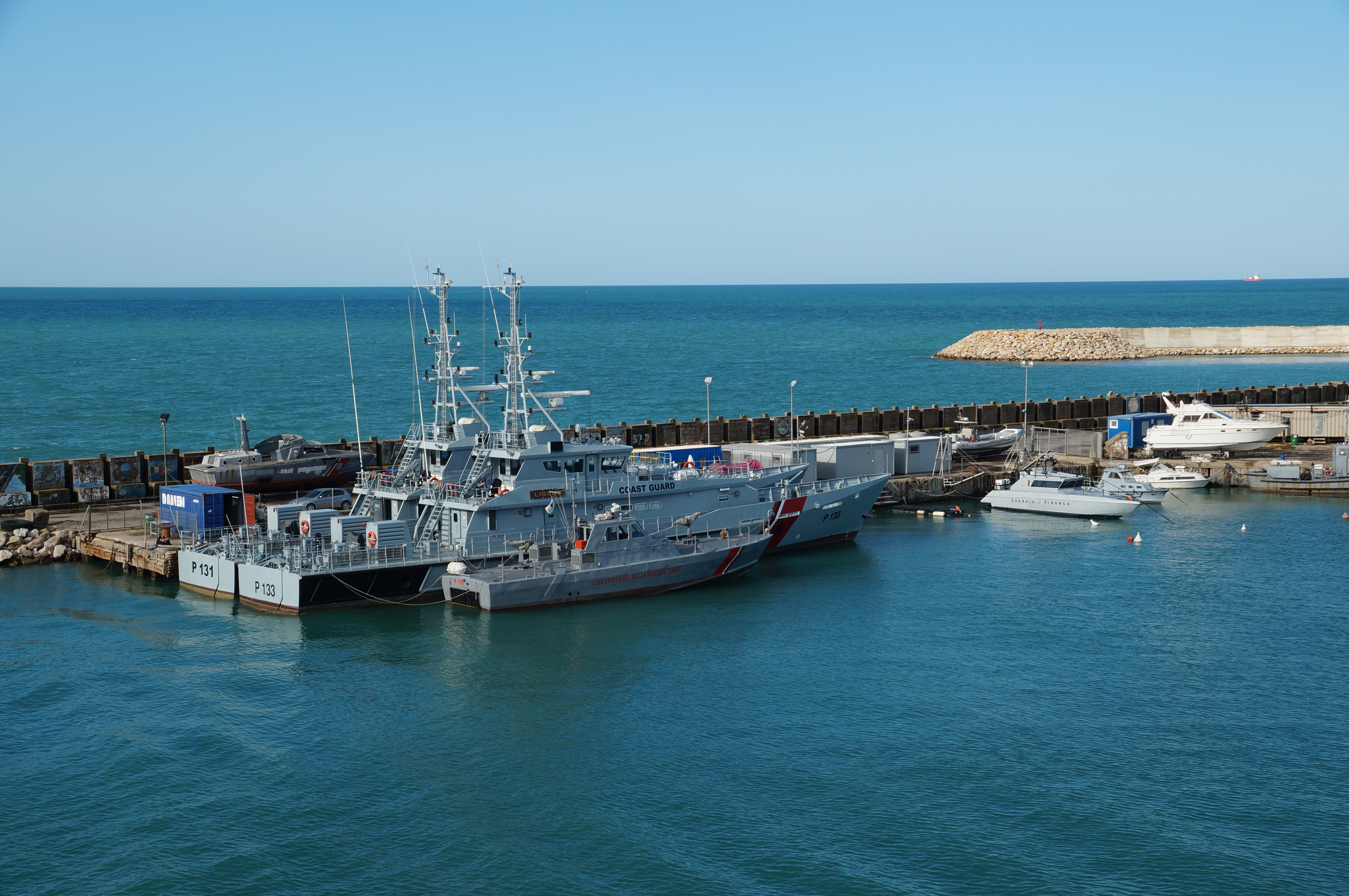
- Lissus in front of Iliria

History

Albania
- Name: Lissus
- Builder: Damen Group - Pashaliman Naval Base, Vlorë, Albania
- Launched: 3 December 2012
- Commissioned: 2012
- Identification: Pennant P133; IMO number: 9663415; MMSI number: 201100125; Callsign: ZADU3
- Status: Active

General characteristics
- Class & type: Damen Stan Patrol 4207
- Length: 42.8 m (140 ft 5 in)
- Beam: 7.1 m (23 ft 4 in)
- Speed: 26 knots (48 km/h; 30 mph)
- Complement: 17

Lissus is an Iliria-class patrol vessel of the Albanian Coast Guard. She is the third ship of her class, behind her sister ships Iliria and Oriku. Lissus was built in Albania in cooperation with the Netherlands. She has taken part in joint operations and exercises alongside NATO ships, showing the Albanian flag in international waters.
