= P133 =

P133 may refer to:

- Albanian patrol vessel Lissus
- BRM P133, a Formula One racing car
- P133, a state regional road in Latvia
