= Porto Palermo Tunnel =

Naval base for submarines in Albania

- Near Porto Palermo Castle
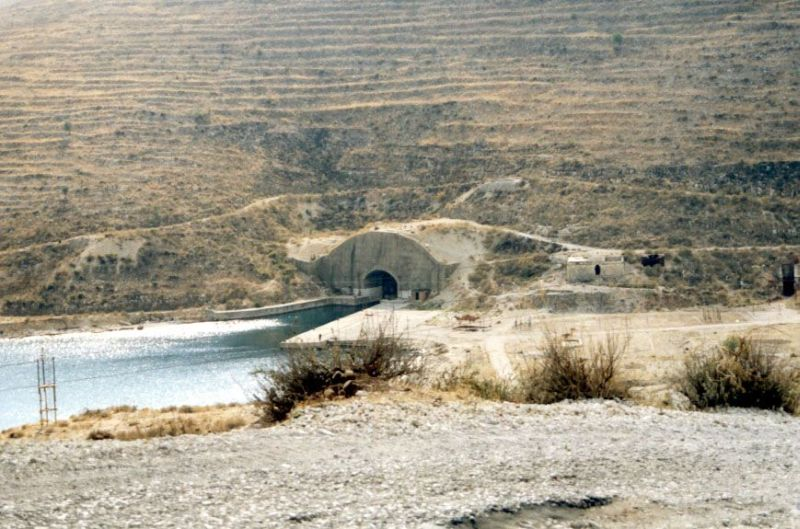

Site information
- Open to the public: None, military zone
- Condition: Not in active use

Location
- Coordinates: 40°4′16″N 19°46′35″E

Site history
- Built: 1969
- Built by: Communist Albania
- In use: 1969–1991
- Materials: Concrete, Steel

Porto Palermo Tunnel (Albanian: Tuneli i Porto Palermos) is claimed to be a submarine bunker built in the Socialist People's Republic of Albania during the rule of leader Enver Hoxha. It is situated at the northern end of the bay of Porto Palermo. It is no longer in use as such, but remains in a military restriction zone. Almost certainly its main function was as a homebase for fast attack craft. Unlike submarines, these craft are short range coastal defence vessels that lie hidden during the day near to where they have to operate at night. Albanian Whiskey class submarines were long range vessels and were normally based further from Pashaliman Naval Base in the Bay of Vlore. Retired in 1998, submarines are still located in Pashaliman.

== Modern Use ==
Porto Palermo has been used recently for joint exercises with other countries.

On 28 April 2013, the USS Monterey took part in a four-hour exercise testing the capabilities of the Albanian Naval Force at Porto Palermo. The exercise involved Albanian sailors reacting to simulated distress calls and reports of suspicious activity.

The 2014 Albanian Lion exercise involved Albanian and British forces practicing an amphibious assault on Porto Palermo. Albanian Lion '14 exercises also took place in Biza, Zall-Herr, Kuçova, and Pashaliman, and was headquartered in Kepi i Palit. The Albanian Ministry of Defense reported that 600 troops and four ships took part in the exercise.

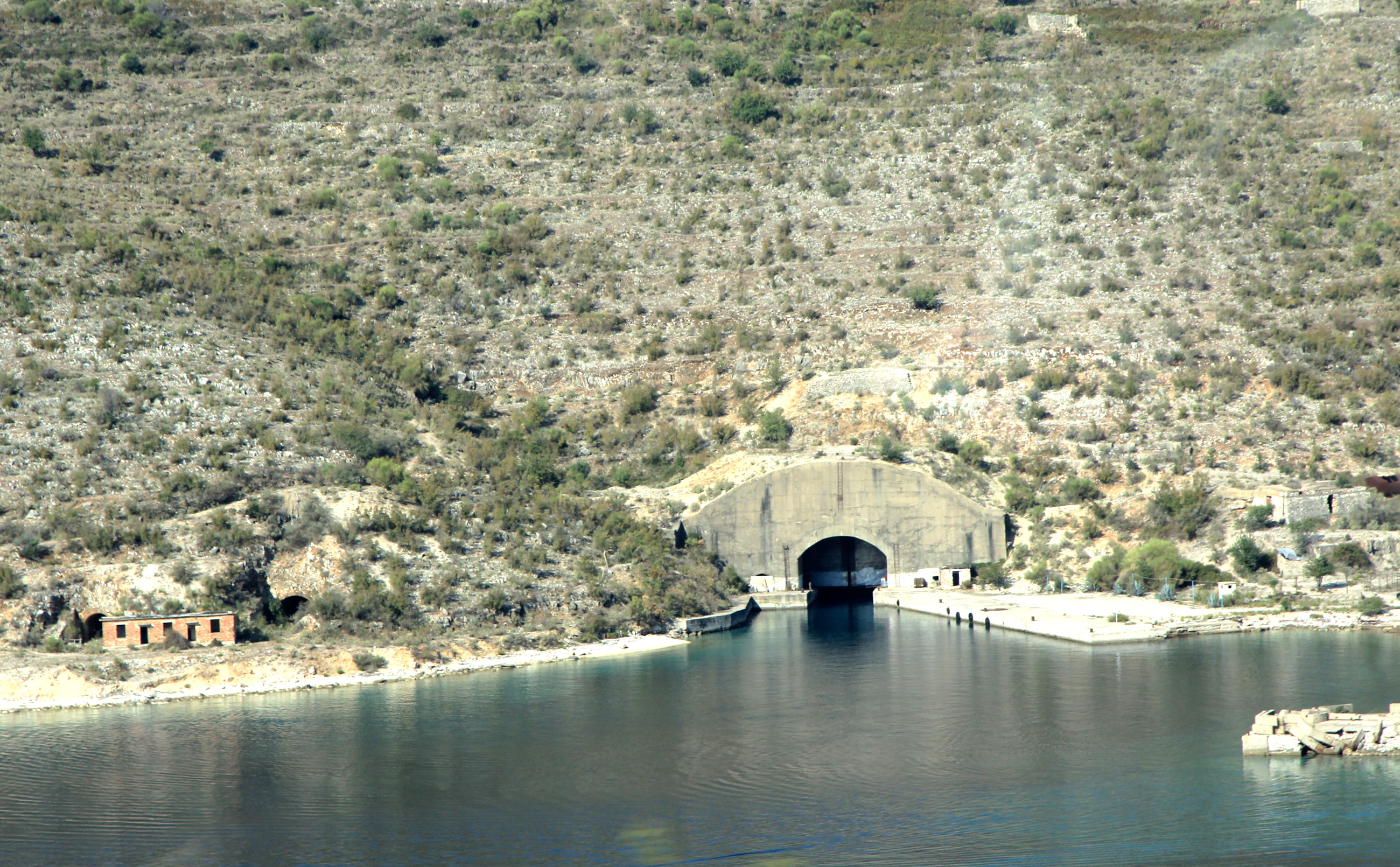
Tunnel entrance

== Bibliography ==
- Historia e Shqiperis ne Kohe Kommuniste, p. 241, published 1996, Olsen
