= Porto Palermo Castle =

Castle near Himarë in southern Albania

- Kalaja e Porto Palermos
- Himarë, Albania
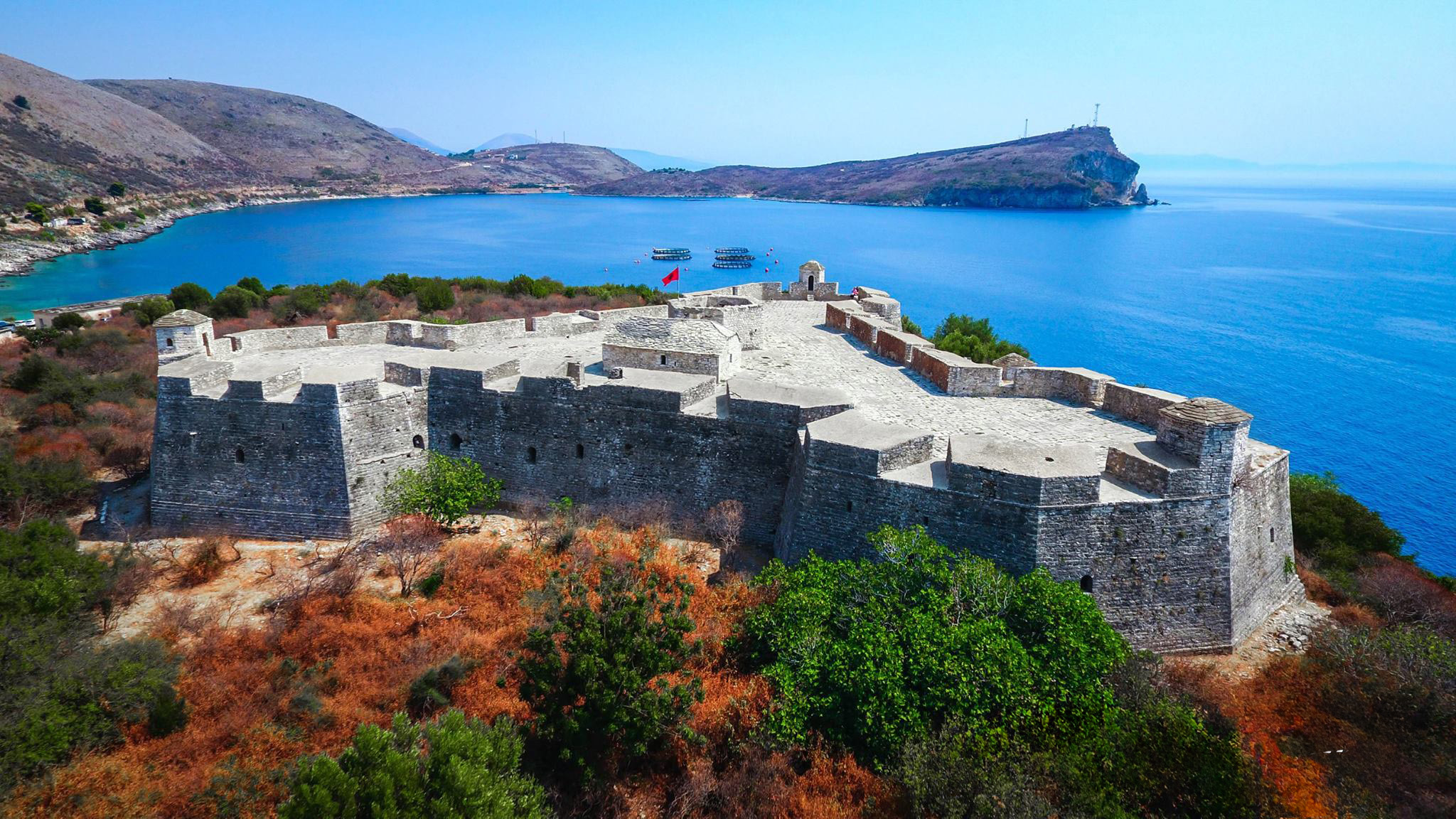
- Porto Palermo Castle

Site information
- Owner: Albania
- Controlled by: Pashalik of Yanina; Ottoman Empire; Albania
- Open to the public: Yes

Location
- Location within Albania
- Coordinates: 40.062317°N 19.790475°E

Site history
- Built by: Ali Pasha of Yanina
- Kep i Palermos Lighthouse
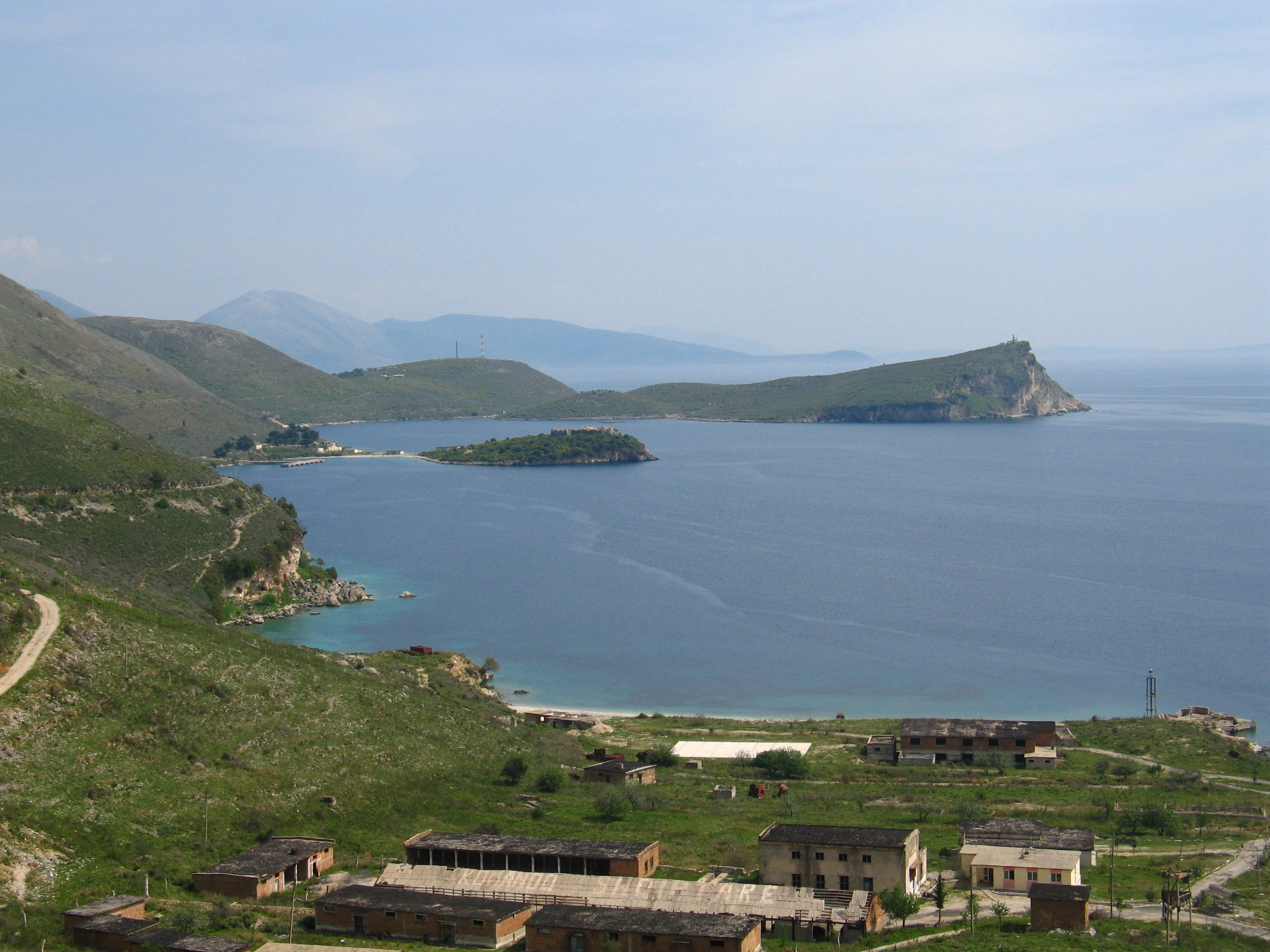
- Foundation: stone base
- Construction: stone tower
- Height: 10 m (33 ft)
- Shape: irregular octagonal tower with balcony and light atop
- Markings: Unpainted (tower)
- Power source: solar power
- Focal height: 113 m (371 ft)
- Range: 8 nmi (15 km; 9.2 mi)
- Characteristic: Fl W 8s

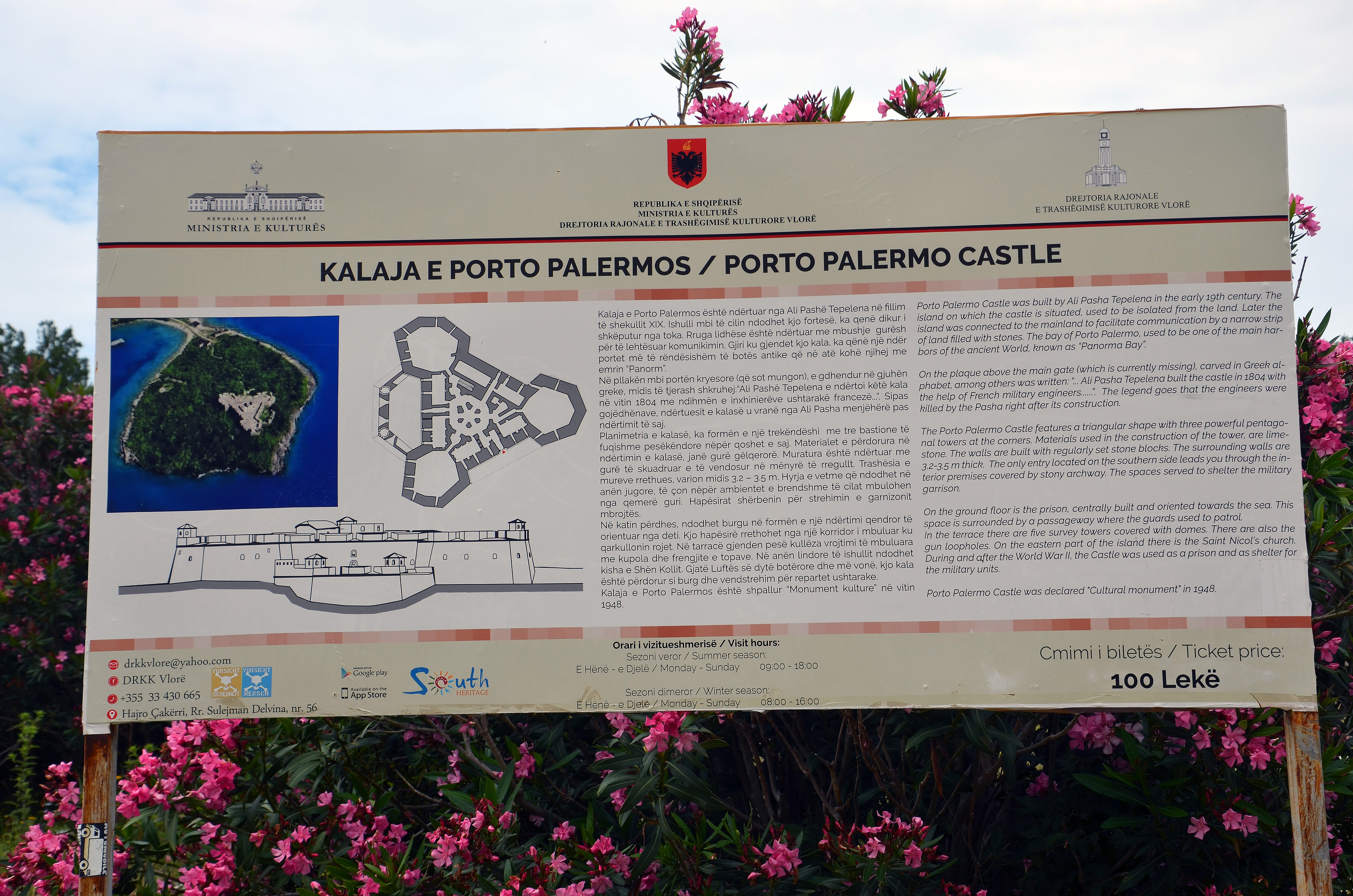
Map of Castle

Porto Palermo Castle (Albanian: Kalaja e Porto Palermos) is an Ottoman castle near Himarë in southern Albania. It is situated in the bay of Porto Palermo, a few kilometers south of Himarë along the Albanian Riviera. The area together with Llamani beach will be proclaimed a protected area holding the status of Protected Landscape by the Albanian Government. It is the most well preserved garrison erected by Ali Pasha in the region.

== Description ==
The castle is located in the bay of Porto Palermo, west of the road connecting Vlorë and Saranda. The site was originally a small island, which was later connected to the mainland through landfill work.

The castle is a three-sided fortress with three large gun bastions at the corners and an open terrace to the south. The castle has a hexagonal central chamber, with a domed ceiling and six large pillars, which allows access to all rooms and terraces. The soldiers stayed in rectangular rooms. The terrace can be reached through a staircase. The castle has observation posts, which were protected by walls and a number of stone-roofed guard houses.

== History ==
Due to its strategic position, the shores of Porto Palermo have been utilized for defensive purposes from antiquity to World War II.

The well preserved castle was built in the early 19th century by Ali Pasha of Tepelena. It is unlikely that a Venetian or Ottoman fortification stood there before. An inscription above the entrance says that the castle was built in 1804 by French engineers for Ali Pasha. He was concerned about the open coastal flank of his pashalik and this was among a number of sea fortresses that he built. In 1803 Ali Pasha offered the castle and port to the Royal Navy. At which time the fort only had 4 or 5 cannon implying that Ali Pasha did not see the fort as important for him. William Martin Leake visited the fort and noted that the garrison consisted of 10 men with two four-pounders. François Pouqueville in 1806 reports, "The tower or fort stands on the southern point of the entrance, connected with the continent by a low narrow isthmus. It consists of a square with bastions, having a few guns, of no service either to command the entrance or to protect the shipping at anchor. Near it are some warehouses, a custom-house, and a Greek church."

Abandoned barracks at Porto Palermo

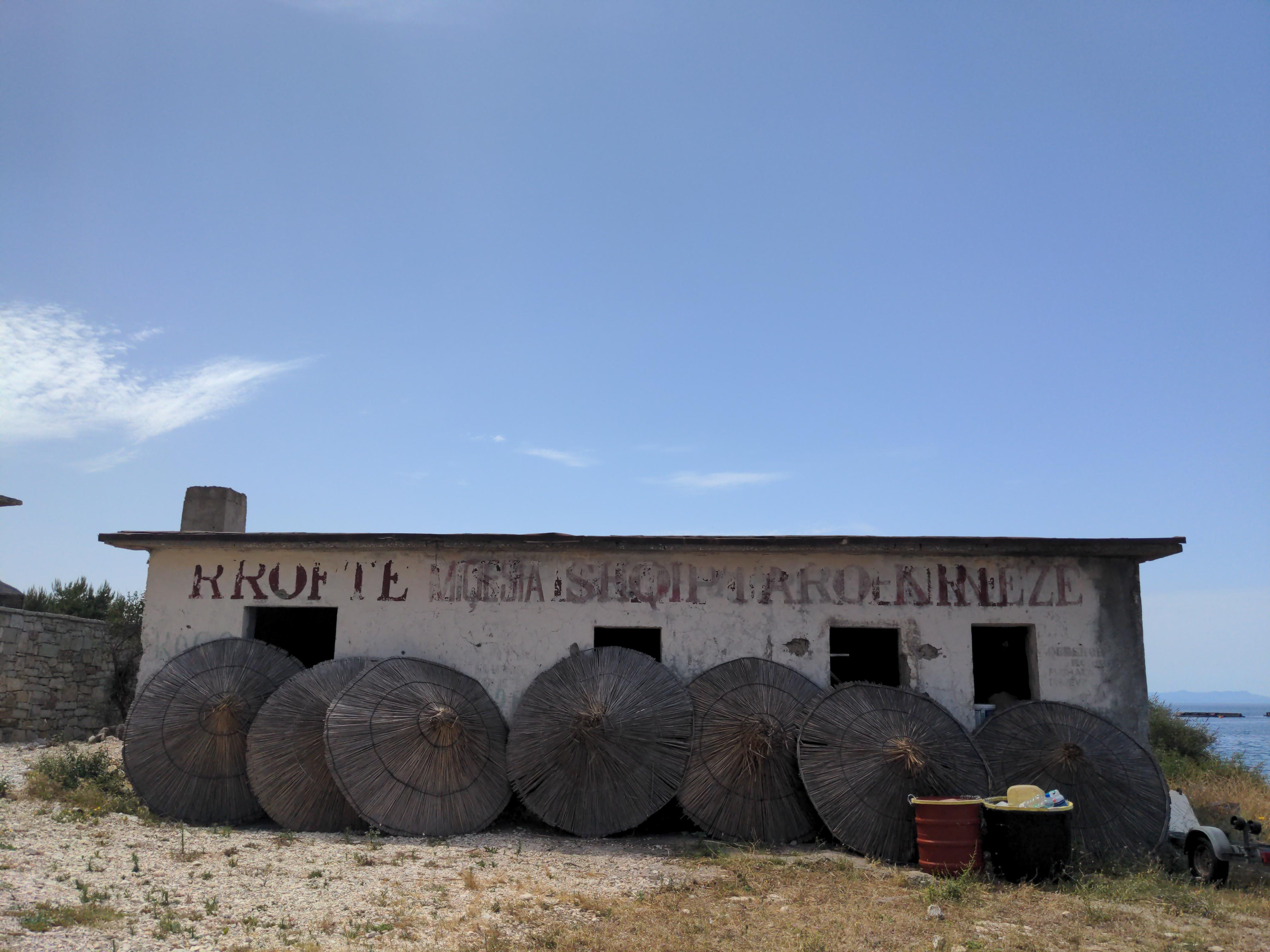
Abandoned building on Porto Palermo, contains former socialist message "Long live the albanian-chinese friendship" (RROFTE MIQESIA SHQIPTARO-KINEZE).

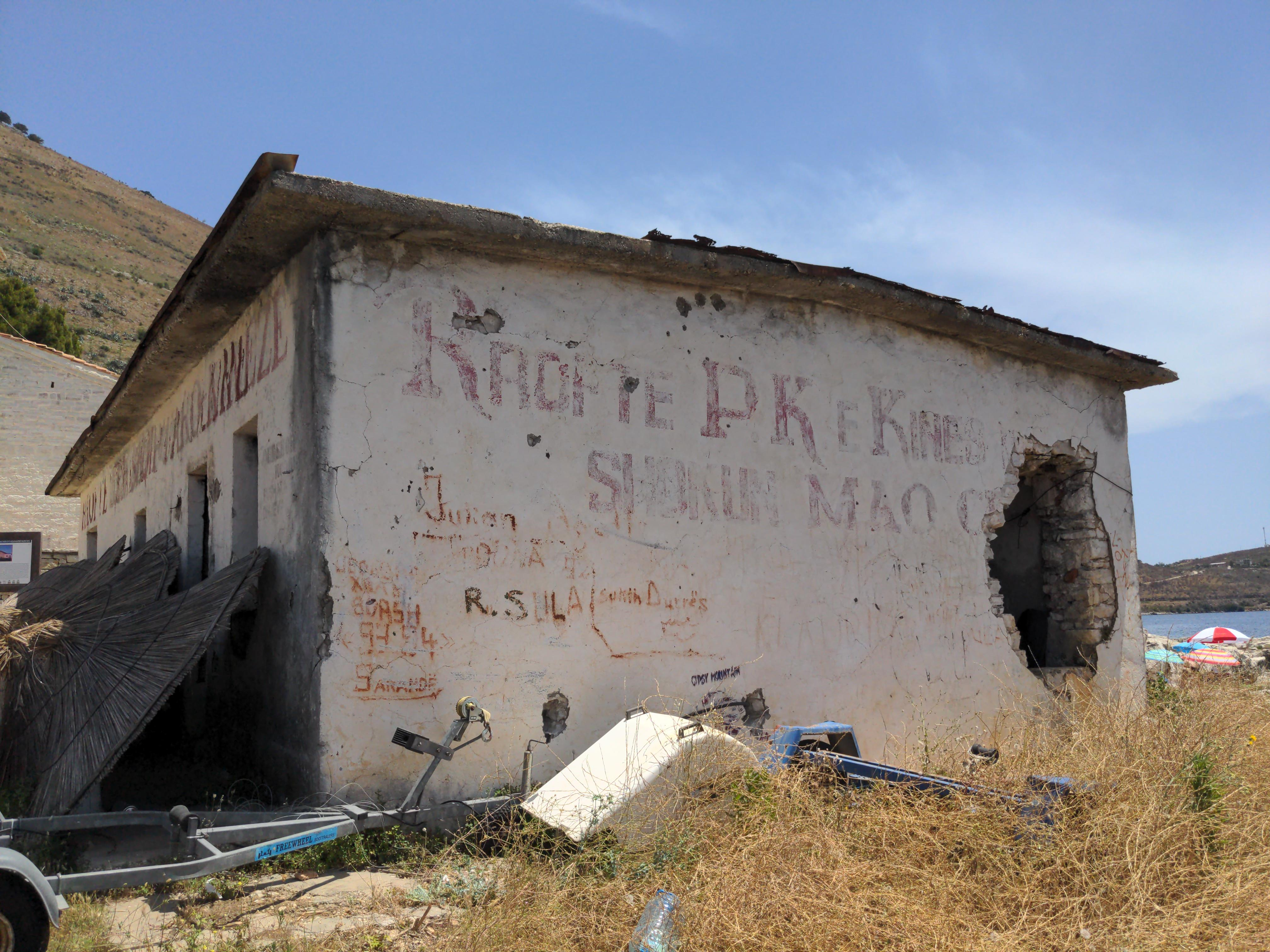
Abandoned building on Porto Palermo (side) with socialist message saying "Long live the Communist Party of China and comrade Mao Zedong" (RROFTE PK E KINES DHE SHOKUN MAO CE DUN)

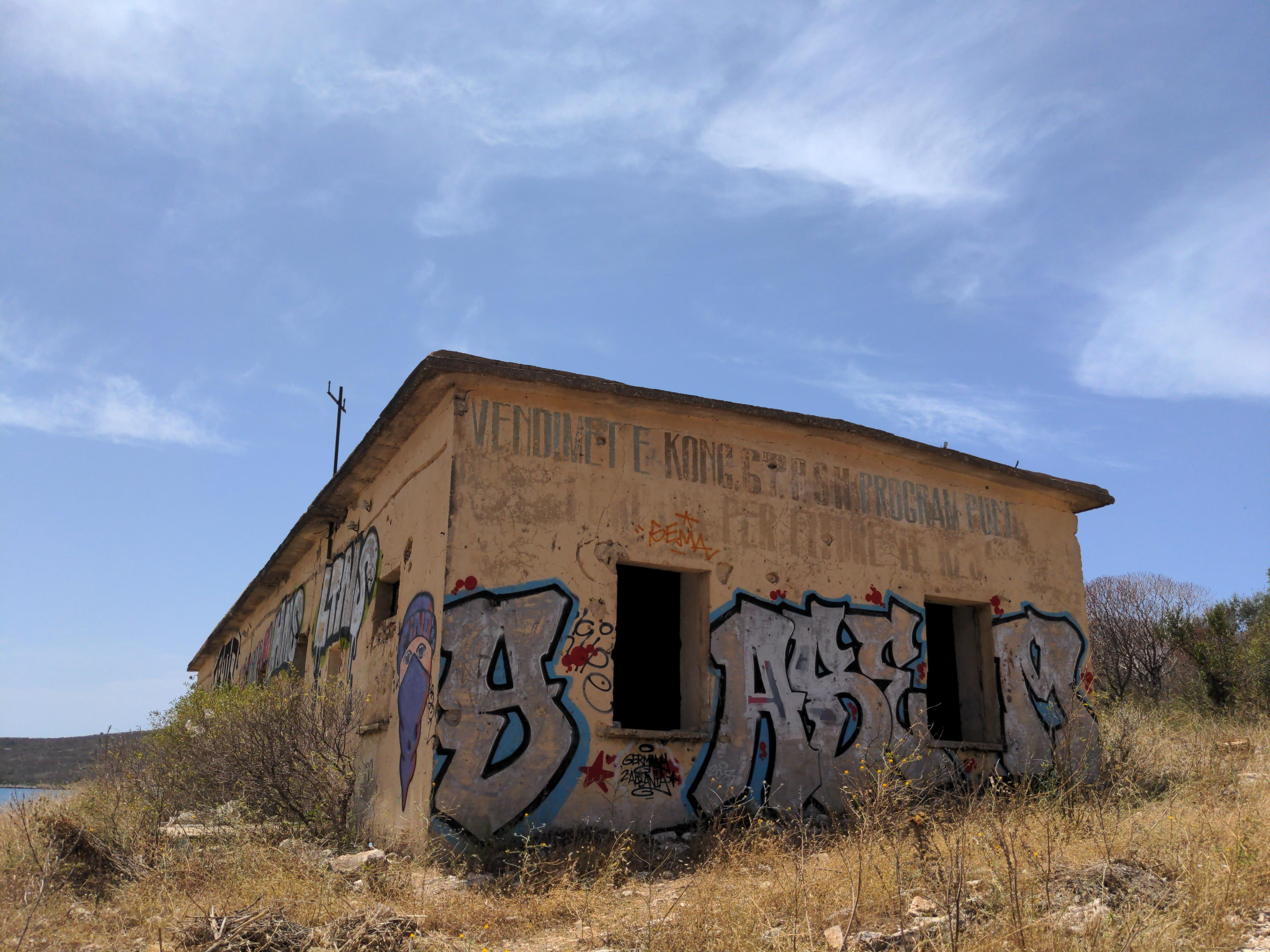
Abandoned building on Porto Palermo, contains former socialist message "THE DECISIONS OF THE 6th Congress of the PLA WORK PROGRAM (...)" (VENDIMET E KONG. 6te PPSH PROGRAM PUNE (...))

== Literature ==
The erection of the castle by Ali Pasha was praised by Greek poet and member of Ali Pasha's court, Ioannis Vilaras.

== See also ==
- List of castles in Albania
- List of lighthouses in Albania
- Tourism in Albania
- Albanian Riviera
- Geography of Albania
- Porto Palermo Tunnel
