= HMBS Arthur Dion Hanna =

The HMBS Arthur Dion Hanna (P 421) is the first of four Damen Stan 4207 patrol vessels commissioned by the Royal Bahamas Defence Force. She was built in the Netherlands, and delivered to the Bahamas in May 2014.

== Design ==
The Arthur Dion Hanna, and her sister ships are 42 metres (138 ft) long and 7 metres (23 ft) wide. Her maximum speed is 20 knots (37 km/h). Her waterjet-propelled high-speed pursuit boat can be deployed or retrieved from her stern launching ramp, without requiring her to come to a stop. She displaces 241 tonnes.
