= Damen Stan Patrol 4207 =

Dutch patrol vessel class

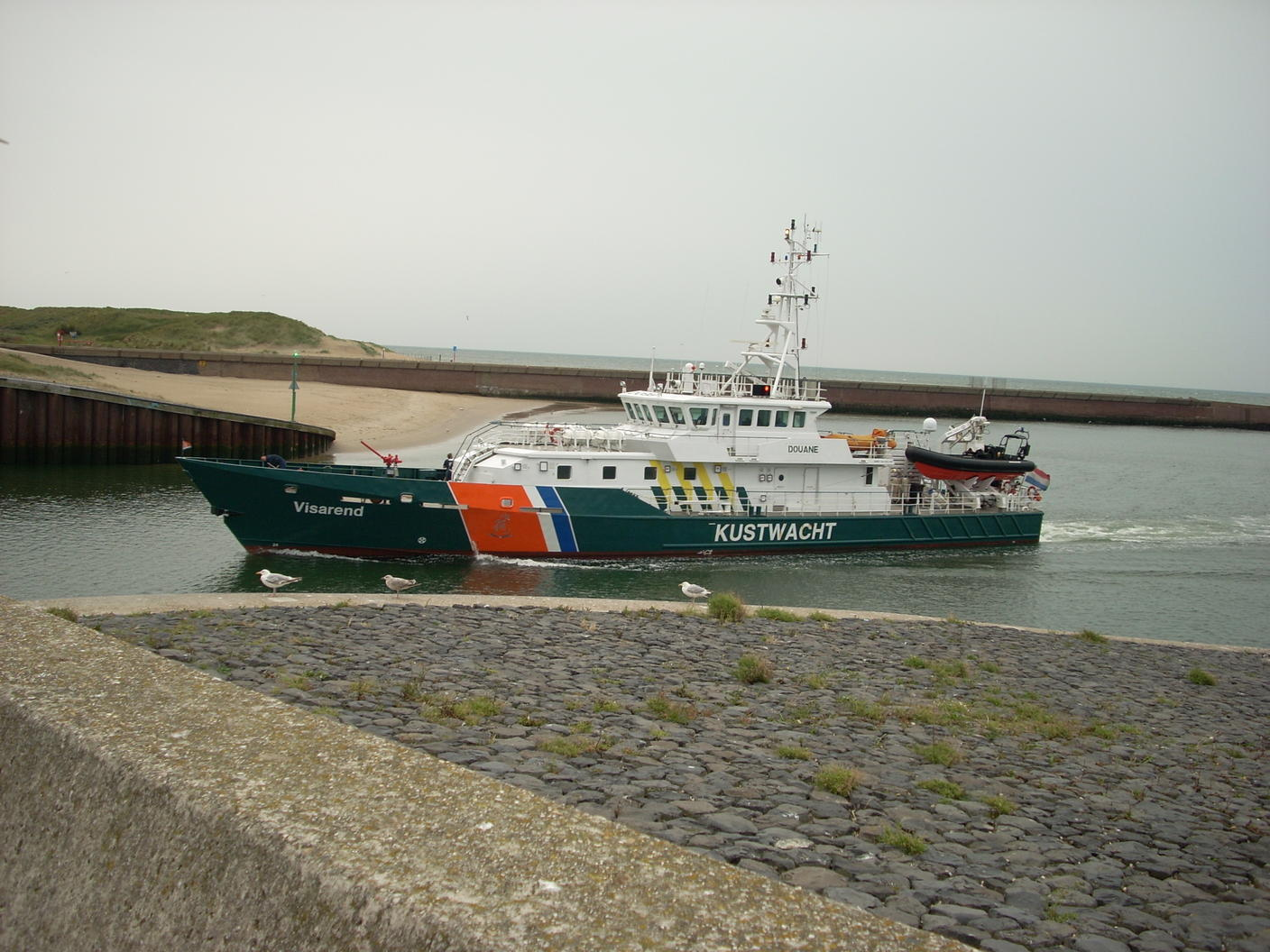
- Netherlands Coast Guard patrol vessel Visarend.

Class overview
- Builders: Damen Group
- Operators: Albanian Coast Guard; Royal Bahamas Defence Force; Barbados Coast Guard; Bulgarian Border Police; Canadian Coast Guard; Honduran Navy; Venezuelan Navy; Netherlands Coast Guard; Mexican Navy; United Kingdom Border Force; Venezuelan Navy
- Subclasses: Hero class (Canada); County class (Jamaica); Tenochtitlan class (Mexico); UKBF 42m Customs Cutter (UK)
- Built: 2001 - present
- In commission: 2001 - present

General characteristics
- Type: Stan Patrol 4207
- Length: 42.8 m (140.4 ft)
- Beam: 7.1 m (23.3 ft)
- Speed: 26 knots (48 km/h)

The Dutch shipbuilding firm The Damen Group, designs and manufactures a range of patrol vessels, of various sizes, including the Damen Stan 4207 Patrol Vessels. The Damen Stan patrol vessel designs' names include a four digit code, where the first two digits are the vessel's length, in metres, and the second two digits are its width.

== Operators ==
Over a dozen nations have classes of vessels based on the Damen Stan 4207 patrol vessel design, including:

- Albanian Coast Guard (4)
- Royal Bahamas Defence Force (4)
- Barbados Coast Guard
- Bulgarian Border Police
- Canadian Coast Guard
- Colombian Navy
- Honduran Navy
- Jamaica Defence Force
- Mexican Navy
- Netherlands Coast Guard
- Nicaraguan Navy
- United Kingdom Border Force
- Venezuelan Navy
- Vietnam (Vietnam Maritime search and Rescue Coordination Center & Vietnam Border Guard)

Some variants are equipped with deck guns, while others are equipped for peacetime duties like search and rescue, fishery protection, environmental monitoring, or intercepting smugglers.

== Ships in class ==
Name	Ship Builder	Commissioned	Decommissioned	Status	Note
Netherlands Coastguard
Visarend	Damen Shipyard	2001		In service	
Zeearend	Damen Shipyard	2002		In service	
United Kingdom Border Force (UKBF 42m Customs Cutter)
HMC Seeker	Damen Shipyard	2001		In service	
HMC Searcher	Damen Shipyard	2002		In service	
HMC Vigilant	Damen Shipyard	2003		In service	
HMC Valiant	Damen Shipyard	2004		In service	
Jamaica Defence Force (County-class)
HMJS Cornwall (2005)	Damen Shipyard	October 27, 2005	2017	Sold to Nicaraguan Navy	
HMJS Middlesex (2005)	Damen Shipyard	April 7, 2006	2017	Sold to Nicaraguan Navy, then to SVG Coast Guard	
HMJS Surrey	Damen Shipyard	June 26, 2007		In service	
HMJS Cornwall (2016)	Damen Shipyard	January, 2017		In service	
HMJS Middlesex (2017)	Damen Shipyard	January, 2017		In service	
Barbados Coast Guard
HMBS Leonard C Banfield	Damen Shipyard	September 14, 2007		In service	
HMBS Rudyard Lewis	Damen Shipyard	September 13, 2008		In service	
HMBS Trident	Damen Shipyard	April 25, 2009		In service	
Albanian Coast Guard (Iliria-class)
Iliria	Damen Shipyard	August, 2008		In service	
Oriku	Pashaliman Shipyard	September, 2011		In service	
Lisus	Pashaliman Shipyard	2012		In service	
Butrinti	Pashaliman Shipyard	2014		In service	
Bulgarian Border Police
Obzor (525)		July 16, 2010		In service	
Canadian Coast Guard (Hero-class)
CCGS Private Robertson V.C.	Irving Shipbuilding	2012		In service	
CCGS Caporal Kaeble V.C.	Irving Shipbuilding	2013		In service	
CCGS Corporal Teather C.V.	Irving Shipbuilding	2013		In service	
CCGS Constable Carrière	Irving Shipbuilding	2013		In service	
CCGS G. Peddle S.C.	Irving Shipbuilding	2013		In service	
CCGS Corporal McLaren M.M.V.	Irving Shipbuilding	2013		In service	
CCGS A. LeBlanc	Irving Shipbuilding	March 20, 2014		In service	
CCGS M. Charles M.B.	Irving Shipbuilding	2014		In service	
CCGS Captain Goddard M.S.M.	Irving Shipbuilding	October 15, 2014		In service	
Colombian Navy
ARC Isla Gorgona	Damen Song Cam	2026		In service	
Mexican Navy (Tenochtitlan-class)
ARM Tenochtitlan (PC-331)	Tampico Naval Shipyard	June 1, 2012		In service	
ARM Teotihuacan (PC-332)	Tampico Naval Shipyard	June 1, 2012		In service	
ARM Palenque (PC-333)	Tampico Naval Shipyard	April 21, 2014		In service	
ARM Mitla (PC-334)	Tampico Naval Shipyard	January 7, 2015		In service	
ARM Uxmal (PC-335)	Tampico Naval Shipyard	July 23, 2015		In service	
ARM Tajín (PC-336)	Tampico Naval Shipyard	November 23, 2015		In service	
ARM Tulum (PC-337)	Tampico Naval Shipyard	August 11, 2016		In service	
ARM Monte Albán (PC-338)	Tampico Naval Shipyard	April 21, 2017		In service	
ARM Bonampak (PC-339)	Tampico Naval Shipyard	July 28, 2017		In service	
ARM Chichen Itzá (PC-340)	Tampico Naval Shipyard	November 6, 2017		In service	
Royal Bahamas Defence Force (Legend-class)
HMBS Arthur Dion Hanna (P421)	Damen Shipyard	June 12, 2014		In service	
HMBS Durward Knowles (P422)	Damen Shipyard	June 23, 2014		In service	
HMBS Leon Livingstone Smith (P423)	Damen Shipyard	September 23, 2014		In service	
HMBS Rolly Gray (P424)	Damen Shipyard	May 4, 2015		In service	
Venezuelan Navy
Fernando Gómez de Saa PG-61	Damen & UCOCAR	June 7, 2014		In service	
Agustín Armario PG-62	Damen & UCOCAR	2019		In service	
Guartcoastas PG-63	Damen Shipyard			Completed for Jamaica	
Chitty Gurling PG-64	Damen Shipyard			Completed for Jamaica	
PG-65	UCOCAR			Cancelled in 2016	
PG-66	UCOCAR			Cancelled in 2016	
Nicaraguan Navy (County-class)
Soberanía I 409	Damen Shipyard	August, 2019		In service	
Soberanía II 411	Damen Shipyard	August, 2019		In service	
Honduran Navy
FNH Lempira (FNH-1401)	Damen Shipyard			In service	
FNH Morazán (FNH-1402)	Damen Shipyard			In service	
Vietnam Maritime Search and Rescue Coordination Center
SAR-411	Damen Shipyard			In service	
SAR-412	Damen Shipyard			In service	
SAR-413	Damen Shipyard			In service	
Vietnam Border Guard
BP 29-19-01	Sông Thu Corporation	January 18, 2018		In service	
BP 48-19-01	Sông Thu Corporation	January 18, 2018		In service	
BP 27-19-01	Sông Thu Corporation	March 7, 2019		In service	
BP 28-19-01	Sông Thu Corporation	March 7, 2019		In service	
