= Kepi i Bishtit të Pallës =

Kepi i Bishtit të Pallës: Bishti i Pallës; Kepi i Palit
- Settlement
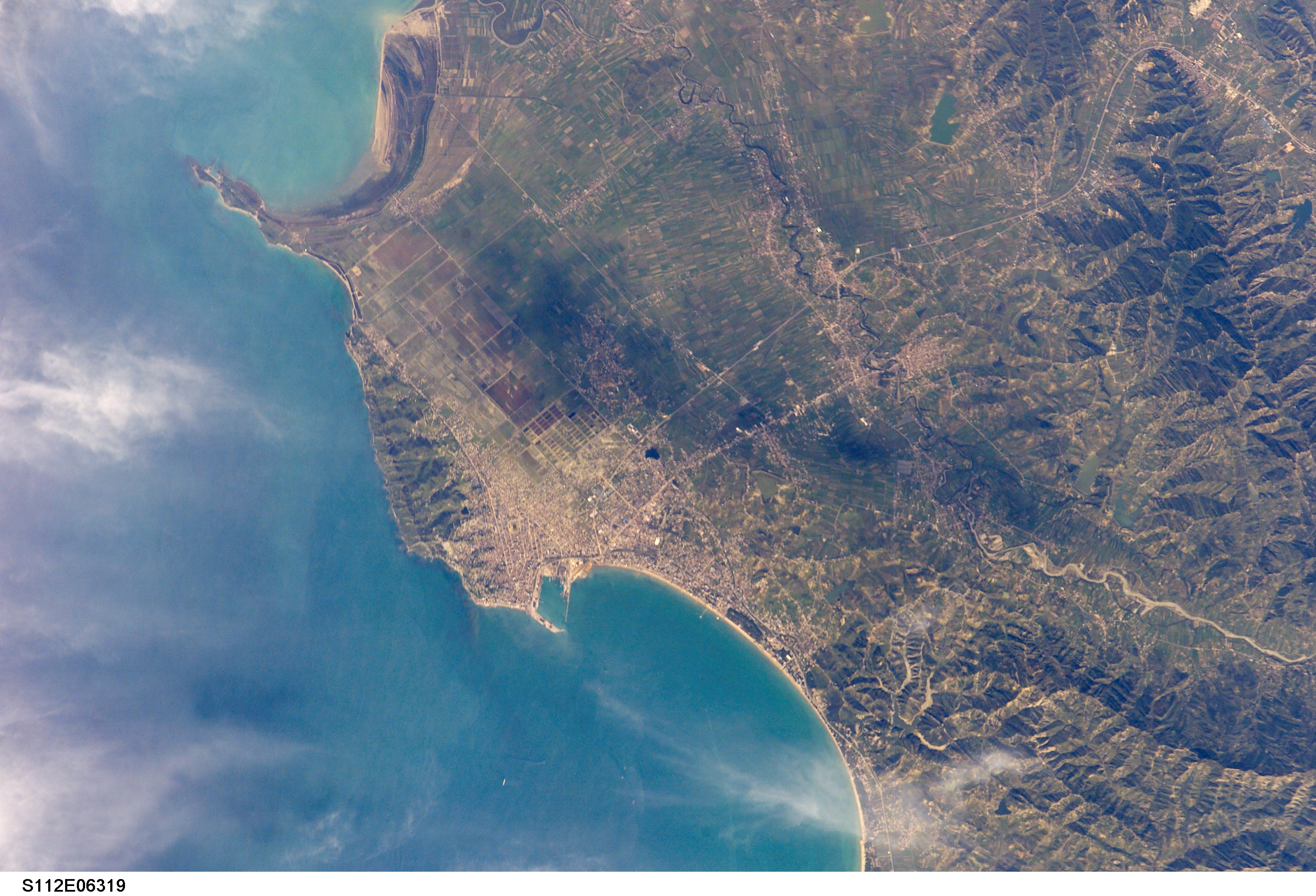
- Satellite image of Durrës area with the cape in the upper left corner

- Location within Albania
- Coordinates: 41°24.75′N 19°23′E
- Country: Albania
- County: Durrës
- Elevation: 11 m (36 ft)
- Time zone: UTC+1 (CET)
  - Summer (DST): UTC+2 (CEST)

Kepi i Bishtit të Pallës ('Cape of Palla's Tail') is located in Albania. It is located in Durrës County, in Northern Albania, 40 km west of Tirana, the country's capital.

The terrain of Kepi i Bishti i Pallës is flat. To the northwest, the Adriatic Sea is closest to Kepi i Bishti i Pallës. (Note: Calculated from the interpolation of all height data (DEM 3") from Viewfinder Panoramas, within a 10 kilometer radius.) The highest point in the area is Mali i Durrës, 186 metres above sea level, 9.2 km south of Kepi i Bishti i Pallës. (Note: The highest point above the local horizon, according to GeoNames elevation data.) There are about 331 people per square kilometre around Kepi i Bishti i Pallës which is densely populated. The nearest larger city is Durrës, 10.7 km south of Kepi i Bishti i Pallës.

== History ==
In 1939, upon the Italian invasion of Albania, Italy attacked all Albanian ports simultaneously. Eight units attacked Kepi i Bishti i Pallës.

The Albanian Naval Force has a base at Kepi i Bishti i Pallës. The 2014 Exercise Albanian Lion, which involved Albanian and British forces practicing an amphibious assault on the Bay of Porto Palermo, was headquartered in Kepi i Bishti i Pallës. The Albanian Ministry of Defence reported that 600 troops and four ships took part in the exercise.

Kepi i Bishti i Pallës is a beach destination.

== Climate ==
The climate is temperate. The average temperature is 17 °C . The hottest month is July, at 29 °C, and the coldest is January, at 4 °C. The average rainfall is 1,492 mm per year. The wettest month is February, at 186 mm of rain, and the driest is August, at 35 mm.

Kepi i Bishti i Pallës

Climate chart (precipitation, max. and min. temperature)
| J | F | M | A | M | J | J | A | S | O | N | D |
| 175 8 1 | 186 12 3 | 133 16 6 | 139 20 9 | 136 26 14 | 70 31 18 | 39 35 23 | 35 33 22 | 100 30 19 | 136 20 13 | 173 17 10 | 172 13 5 |
- █ Average max. and min. temperatures in °C
- █ Precipitation totals in mm
Imperial conversion
| J | F | M | A | M | J | J | A | S | O | N | D |
| 6.9 46 34 | 7.3 54 37 | 5.2 61 43 | 5.5 68 48 | 5.4 79 57 | 2.8 88 64 | 1.5 95 73 | 1.4 91 72 | 3.9 86 66 | 5.4 68 55 | 6.8 63 50 | 6.8 55 41 |
- █ Average max. and min. temperatures in °F
- █ Precipitation totals in inches
