= Commander of the Naval Force (Albania) =

- Komandanti i Forcës Detare
- Naval ensign of Albania

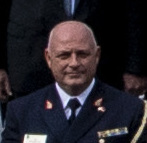
- Incumbent; Brigadier General Ilir Xhebexhia since 16 October 2020
- Albanian Naval Force
- Reports to: Chief of the Albanian General Staff
- Nominator: Minister of Defence
- Appointer: The president of Albania
- Formation: 1928
- First holder: Abdi Mati
- Website: Official website

The Albanian commander of the Naval Force (Albanian: Komandant i Forcës Detare) is the leader of the country's navy. The commander of the Naval Force is appointed by the president of Albania and serves under the minister of defence.

The current commander, Major General Ylber Dogjani, was appointed on 13 October 2015. General Dogjani previously served as director of Albania's Military Intelligence Service, the SHIU.

== Commanders of the Naval Force ==
=== Albanian Kingdom ===
No.	Portrait	Commander of the navy	Took office	Left office	Time in office	Ref.
1	Abdi Mati [sq]	Captain; Abdi Mati (?–1992)	1928	1939	10–11 years	

=== People's Socialist Republic of Albania ===
No.	Portrait	Commander of the PCRA	Took office	Left office	Time in office	Minister of Defence	Ref.
1	Abdi Mati [sq]	Rear Admiral; Abdi Mati (?–1992)	1945	1957	11–12 years	Enver Hoxha; Beqir Balluku	
2	Teme Sejko	Rear Admiral; Teme Sejko (1922–1961)	1958	August 1960	1–2 years	Beqir Balluku	
3	Hito Çako	Rear Admiral; Hito Çako (1923–1975)	September 1960	September 1961	1 year	Beqir Balluku	
(1)	Abdi Mati [sq]	Rear Admiral; Abdi Mati	September 1961	September 1973	12 years	Beqir Balluku	
4	Qamil Poda	Qamil Poda (Note: Qamil Poda held no military rank.)	September 1973	July 1981	7 years	Beqir Balluku; Mehmet Shehu; Kadri Hazbiu	
5	Ndue Jaku [sq]	Ndue Jaku (born 1941) (Note: Ndue Jaku held no military rank.)	1981	1991	9–10 years	Kadri Hazbiu; Prokop Murra; Kiço Mustaqi; Ndriçim Karakaçi	

=== Republic of Albania ===
No.	Portrait	Commander of the navy	Took office	Left office	Time in office	Minister of Defence	Ref.
1	Tasim Meçe	Captain; Tasim Meçe	1991	1992	0–1 years	Perikli Teta; Alfred Moisiu	
2	Fitim Halili	Captain; Fitim Halili	1992	1993	0–1 years	Safet Zhulali	
3	Edmond Zhupani	Rear Admiral; Edmond Zhupani	1993	1994	0–1 years	Safet Zhulali	
4	Muharrem Kuçana	Rear Admiral; Muharrem Kuçana	1994	1996	1–2 years	Safet Zhulali	
(3)	Edmond Zhupani	Rear Admiral; Edmond Zhupani	1996	1997	0–1 years	Safet Zhulali	
5	Vladimir Beja	Captain; Vladimir Beja	March 1997	6 September 1997	0 years	Safet Zhulali; Shaqir Vukaj; Sabit Brokaj	
6	Robert Bali	Captain; Robert Bali	September 1997	October 1998	1 years	Sabit Brokaj; Luan Hajdaraga	
7	Kudret Çela	Rear Admiral; Kudret Çela	November 1998	March 2005	6 years	Luan Hajdaraga; Ilir Gjoni; Ismail Lleshi; Pandeli Majko	
8	Kristaq Gërveni	Captain; Kristaq Gërveni	March 2005	September 2009	4 years	Pandeli Majko; Fatmir Mediu; Gazmend Oketa	
(7)	Kudret Çela	Rear Admiral; Kudret Çela	September 2009	January 2012	2 years	Arben Imami	
−	Ferdinand Kreshpani	Captain; Ferdinand Kreshpani; Acting	January 2012	August 2012	0 years	Arben Imami	
9	Qemal Shkurti	Brigadier General; Qemal Shkurti	15 August 2012	October 2015	3 years	Arben Imami; Mimi Kodheli	
10	Ylber Dogjani	Major General; Ylber Dogjani	13 October 2015	16 September 2019	3 years	Mimi Kodheli; Olta Xhaçka	
11	Ilir Xhebexhia	Brigadier General; Ilir Xhebexhia	16 October 2020	Incumbent	5 years	Olta Xhaçka	
