= Training Boat for Cadets =

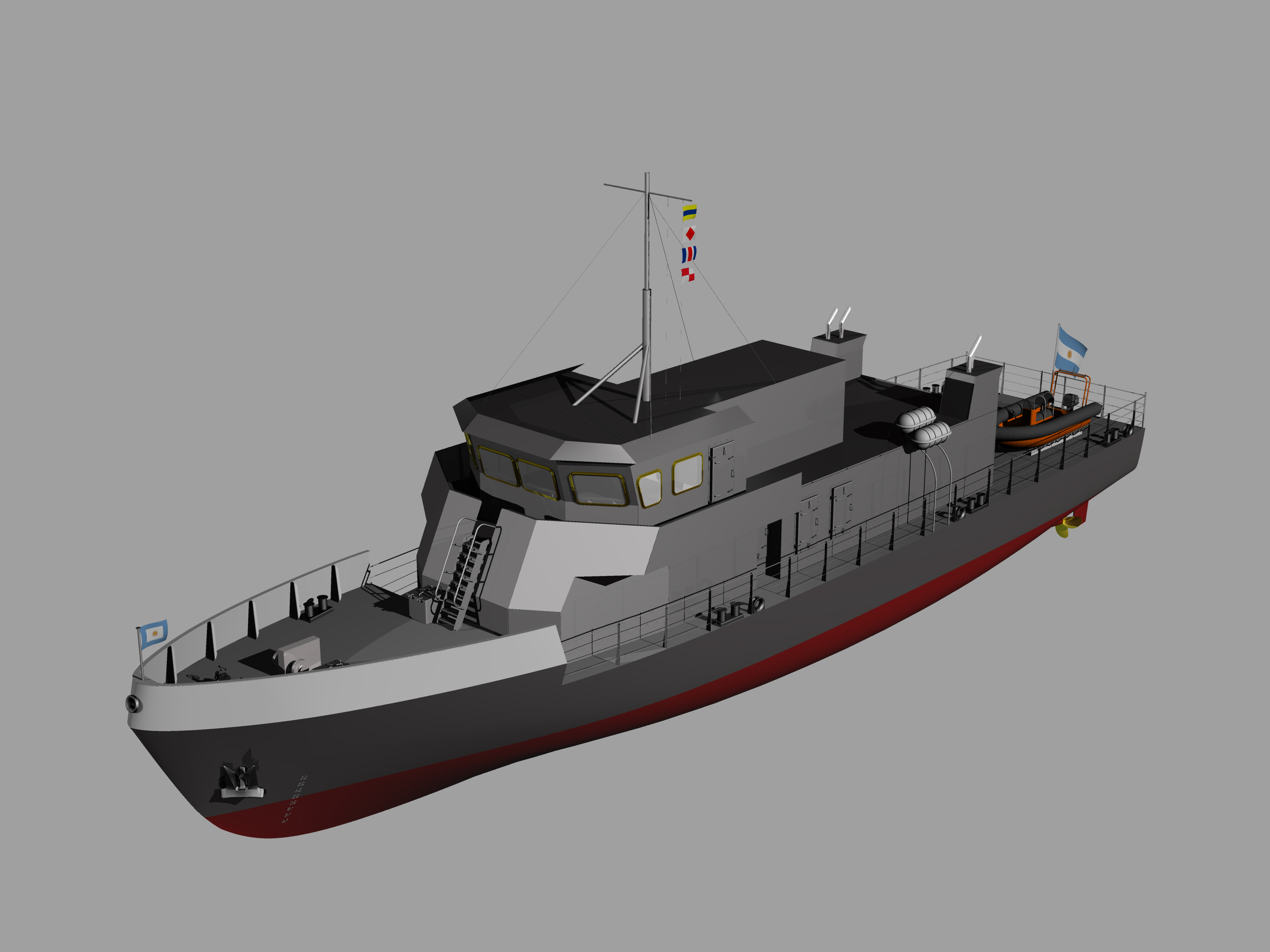

History

Argentina
- Name: Training Boat for Cadets (In spanish, Lancha de Instrucción para Cadetes)
- Builder: Rio Santiago Shipyard
- Launched: 2
- Commissioned: 6
- Status: In Sea Trials

General characteristics
- Displacement: 212 t
- Length: 36 m
- Beam: 8 m
- Height: 2,2 m
- Speed: 12 kn
- Range: 6.000 km

The Training Boats for Cadets (LICA) are a class of training boats developed by the Río Santiago Shipyard (ARS) to equip the Argentine Navy. With these additions, the ESNM will once again be in tune with the training institutes of the foreign Armed Forces of reference.

== Design and development ==
This class of ships began to be designed in 2014, as part of an agreement signed between the Argentine Navy and the Río Santiago Shipyard. Its design has been based on the Yard Class training boats of the United States Navy, although the hull lines, propulsion, structure, internal spaces, and engineering in general, are of national development. The LICA will have practical and theoretical instruction capacity for cadets, in coastal navigation up to 12 nautical miles from the coast. It has equipment and systems in accordance with the regulations of the International Maritime Organization (IMO). In its construction, nationally manufactured materials will be prioritized. Each unit will have a classroom with capacity for 20 people that can be adapted to nursing if the situation requires it. It will also have HF, VHF and UHF communications and food storage for voyages lasting a minimum of 10 days. Its design characteristics will also allow the practice of the typical seafaring tasks of a warship. Due to its navigation capacity throughout the sea and river coast, its specific purpose of instruction can be complemented with humanitarian aid tasks in case of natural disasters.

The Navy has ordered two units for the Military Naval School with the first expected to enter service in late 2018 or early 2019. In November 2017, the assembly of the first boat was completed, which was launched in October 2021.
