= Albanian patrol vessel Butrinti =

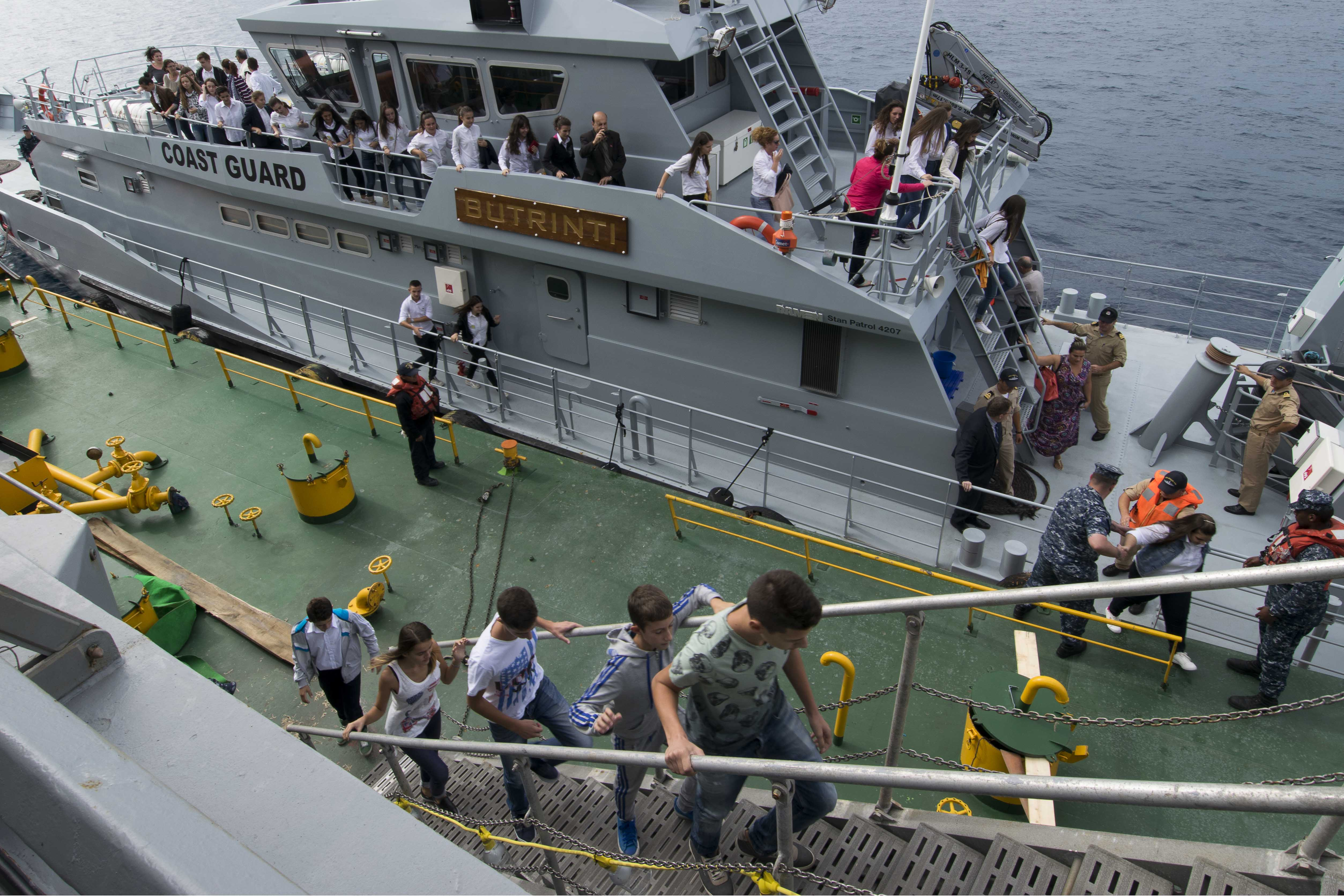
- Albanian students tour Butrinti

History

Albania
- Name: Butrinti
- Ordered: 2007
- Builder: Pashaliman Naval Base
- Launched: 8 April 2014
- Commissioned: 2014
- Identification: Pennant P134; IMO number: 9663427; MMSI number: 201100132; Callsign: ZADU4
- Status: In active service

General characteristics
- Class & type: Damen Stan 4207 patrol vessel
- Length: 42.8 m (140 ft)
- Beam: 7.1 m (23 ft)
- Speed: 26 knots (48 km/h; 30 mph)
- Complement: 17

Butrinti is a Damen Stan 4207 patrol vessel of the Albanian Naval Force, built at the Pashaliman Naval Base. She is used to perform a number of tasks and duties, including coastal patrol, search and rescue, control and monitoring of maritime traffic, marine environment protection. She is also used in joint operations between Albania and other European countries.

== History ==
Butrinti was launched in 2014. The sailors from USS Porter visited the ship in 2015 as part of a joint public relations exercise.
