= Khobi-class tanker =

Class overview
- Name: Project 437N (NATO: Khobi Class)
- Builders: Zhdanov Shipyard, Leningrad
- Operators: Soviet Navy; Russian Navy; Indonesian Navy
- Built: 1953-1958
- In commission: 1955-present
- Completed: 20
- Retired: 5

General characteristics
- Type: Replenishment Oiler
- Displacement: 1,525 tons full load
- Length: 63.2 m (207 ft)
- Beam: 10.0 m (33 ft)
- Draught: 4.5 m (15 ft)
- Propulsion: 2 Type 8DR 30/50 diesels; 1,600 bhp; 2 shafts
- Speed: 13 knots (24 km/h)
- Range: 2,500nm at 12.5 knots (23 km/h)
- Capacity: 1,000 tons fuel oil; 550 tons diesel fuel
- Complement: 33
- Sensors & processing systems: 1 Don-2 (navigation); 1 Spin Trough (search)
- Electronic warfare & decoys: IFF
- Armament: none
- Aircraft carried: none

The Khobi class (Project 437N) is a class of replenishment oiler built for the Soviet navy between 1953 and 1958.

== Construction ==
Ships of the Khobi class were built at the Zhdanov shipyard in Leningrad, USSR. They were small tankers, similar in size to US Navy gasoline tankers (AOG). The Project 437N could refuel one ship at a time over the bow. A total of 20 vessels were built for the Soviet Navy. Two vessels were later transferred to Albania in 1958–59 as Patos and Semani (ex-Linda?) and one vessel was transferred to Indonesia.

== Ships in class ==
There were 20 vessels in the class.

Name	Yard No.	Laid Down	Launched	Commissioned	Fate
Alazan	No. 635	September 1953	unknown	December 1954	
Tartu	No. 636	January 1955	1955	December 1955	
Goryn	No. 643	February 1955	1955	December 1955	paid off 1974
Khobi	No. 644	April 1955	unknown	July 1956	
Sosyva	No. 645	June 1955	unknown	July 1956	
Orsha	No. 646	August 1955	unknown	September 1956	paid off 2005
Titan	No. 650	28 April 1955	1956	December 1956	
Tunguska	No. 657	November 1955	unknown	September 1956	
Sunta	No. 658	January 1956	1956	October 1956	transferred to Indonesia as KRI Balikpapan (901)
Linda	No. 659	March 1956	1956	November 1956	
Indiga	No. 662	August 1956	unknown	May 1957	
Moksha	No. 663	October 1956	unknown	July 1957	paid off 2010
Sysola	No. 664	August 1956	unknown	July 1957	
Cheremshan	No. 667	December 1956	unknown	September 1957	paid off 2005
Lovat	No. 670	March 1957	1957	December 1957	
Shacha	No. 673	July 1957	unknown	June 1958	
Seyma	No. 674	August 1957	unknown	June 1958	paid off 2005
Shelon	No. 675	January 1957	unknown	October 1958	

== Cheremshan black market activity ==
During 1995–1996, while operating as a wastewater/sludge lighter with the Northern Fleet, the Cheremshan stole 1,197.5 tons of fuel from other Russian Navy vessels.
