= Albanian patrol vessel Iliria =

Patrol boat of Albanian Coast guard

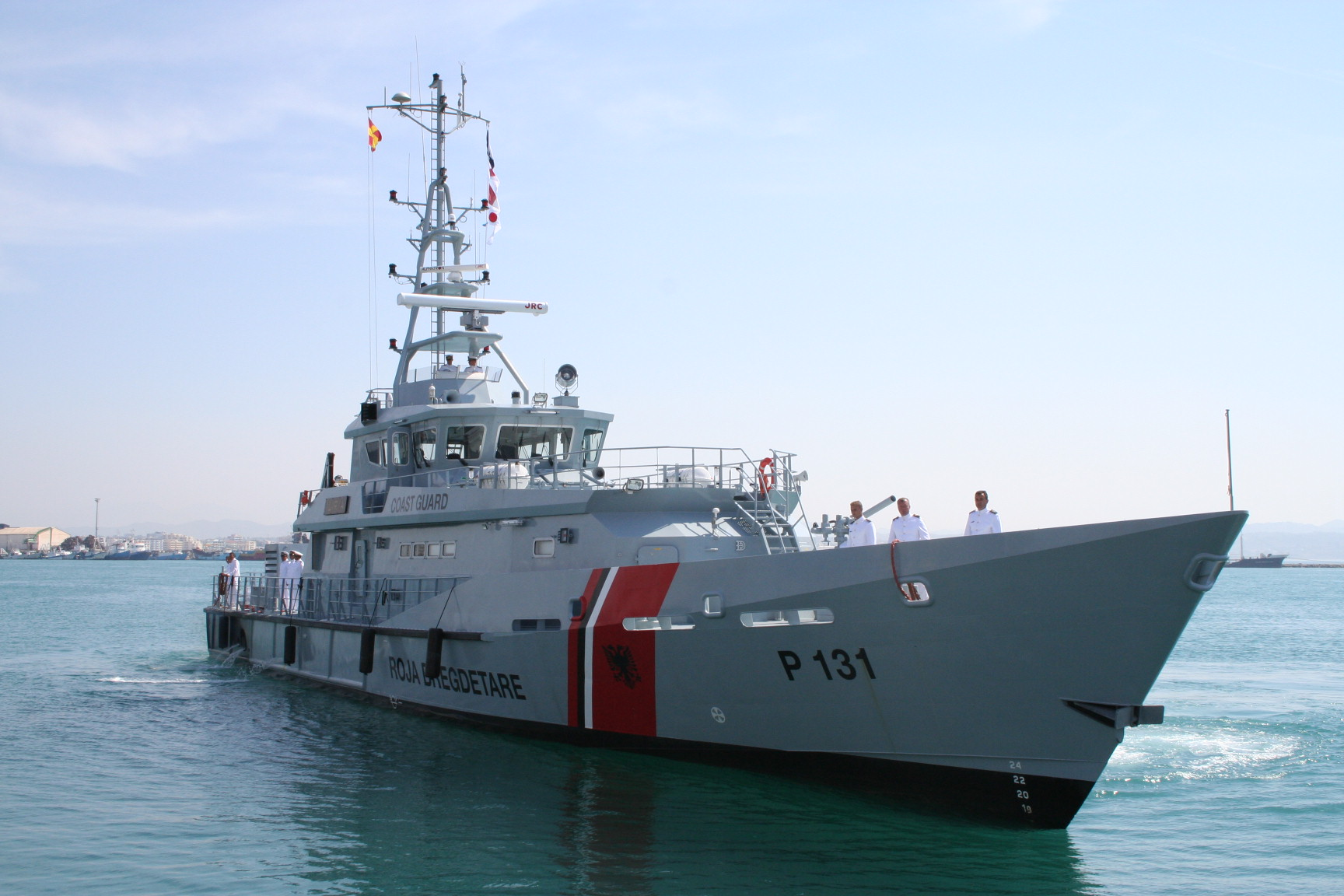
- Albanian Coast Guard patrol vessel Iliria.

History

Albania
- Name: Iliria
- Builder: Damen Group, Netherlands
- Launched: 28 May 2007
- Commissioned: 2008
- Identification: Pennant P131; IMO number: 9524164; MMSI number: 201100109; Callsign: ZAD102
- Status: Active

General characteristics
- Class & type: Iliria-class
- Length: 42.8 m (140 ft)
- Beam: 7.1 m (23 ft)
- Speed: 26 knots (48 km/h; 30 mph)
- Complement: 17

Iliria is an Iliria-class patrol vessel of the Albanian Coast Guard, built in Gorinchem, Netherlands by Damen Group. The class takes the name of the ship itself as it is its first, while the name itself is based on Illyria, an ancient region where today's Albania is part. The ship was commissioned and entered in service in 2008.

== First of class ==
In 2007, Damen Shipyard in Gorinchem, Netherlands was awarded a 31 million euros contract to build four patrol vessels. Most of the funding would be provided by the Albanian government through the Ministry of Defense and 35% of it would be supported through a grant from the Dutch Government. The Iliria-class design is based on Damen Stan 4207 patrol vessel. The first ship Iliria bears the name of the class itself as it is its first and is the only one built in the Netherlands, while the other three were built locally in Pashaliman Shipyard with the assistance of the company itself.

The ship was delivered to Albania in August 2008 with a ceremony held in the port of Durres and entered service a few weeks later on September 5 of the same year.

== Construction and capabilities ==
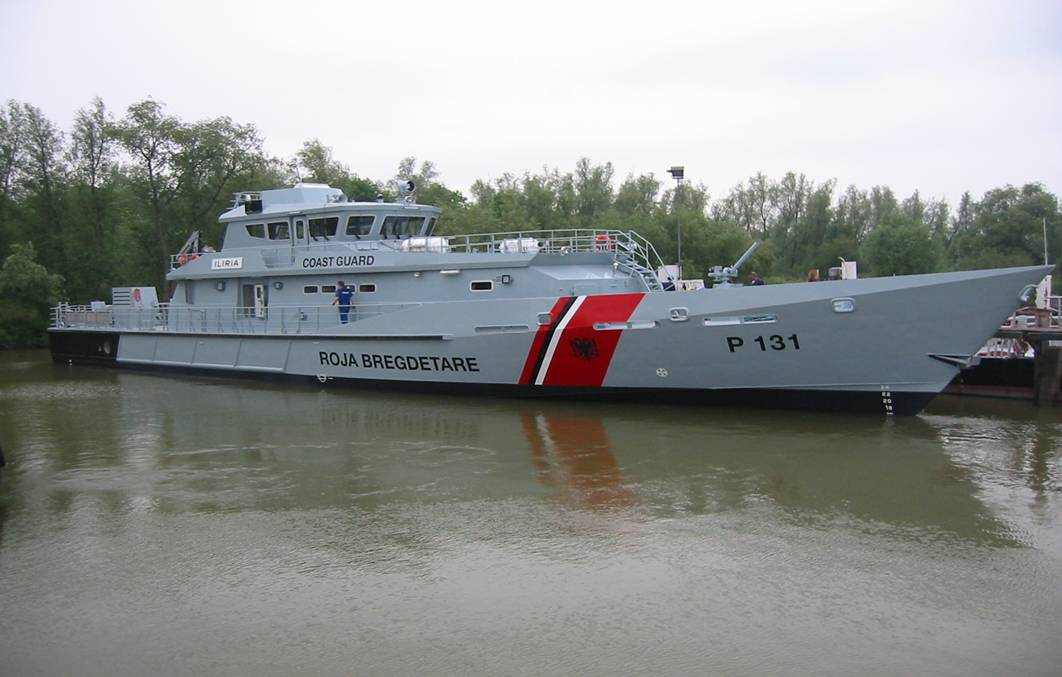
Iliria patrol vessel anchored in the Netherlands prior to delivery.

Iliria is the first of the patrol vessels with its 42.8 meters long overall and a 7.11 beam, part of the fleet of the Albanian Coast Guard. It was built in 2008 at Damen Shipyards in the Netherlands unlike its three sister boats of the same class that were built locally under license in Pashaliman Shipyard, near Vlorë. She has a steel hull with an aluminum superstructure with a 240 gross tonnage (GT) and a 75 net tonnage (NT). She is equipped with a stern launching ramp, capable of deploying and retrieving a 7-meter Rigid Inflatable Boat, for rescue or pursuit.

Built to withstand missions from 7 to 14 days at a range of 1800 nautical miles at 12 knots and it is suitable for Albania given its 225-mile coastline and its Coast Guard mission. It can reach a standard speed of 12 knot (unit)s which in some cases can go up to 26 knots making it suitable for the pursuit of other watercraft in case of need.

== Propulsion ==
The ship is propelled by two controllable pitch propellers driven by two Caterpillar 3516B TA-HD diesel engines rated at 4,200 kW (5,600 hp) which are geared by two Reintjes WLS 930. The patrol vessel is also equipped with two Caterpillar C4.4 generators. The vessel has a maximum speed of 26 knots (48 km/h; 30 mph). Iliria has a fuel capacity of 23 m^{3} (5,100 imp gal) giving the vessel a range of 1,800 nautical miles (3,300 km; 2,100 mi) at 12 knots (22 km/h; 14 mph) and an endurance of up to 150 hours.

== See also ==
- Albanian Coast Guard
- List of equipment of the Albanian Armed Forces
