= Albanian patrol vessel Oriku =

2011 Albanian Naval Force Damen Stan 4207 patrol vessel

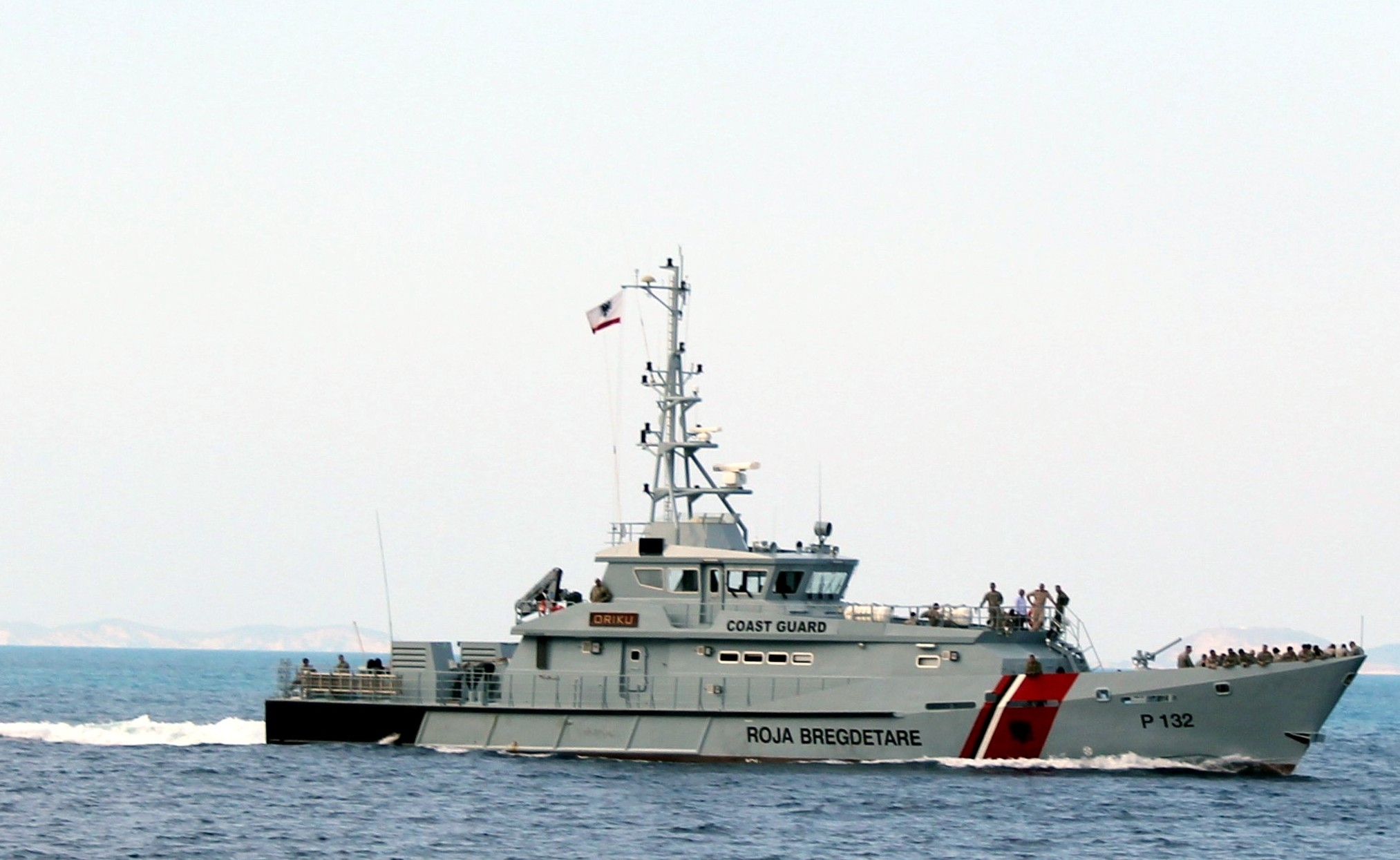
- Oriku P132

History

Albania
- Name: Oriku
- Namesake: Oricum
- Builder: Damen Group – Pashaliman Naval Base, Vlorë, Albania
- Launched: 13 September 2011
- Commissioned: 2011
- Identification: Pennant P132; IMO number: 9591636; MMSI number: 201100117; Callsign: ZADU2
- Status: Active

General characteristics
- Class & type: Damen Stan Patrol 4207
- Length: 42.8 m (140 ft)
- Beam: 7.1 m (23 ft)
- Speed: 26 knots (48 km/h; 30 mph)
- Complement: 17

Orik is a patrol vessel of the Albanian Navy Brigade, built by the Damen Group in the Pasha Liman naval shipyard. She was the second Damen Stan 4207 patrol vessel to be built, and was commissioned in 2011. She was built in Albania.

Jane's Naval Construction and Retrofit Markets reported that Albania had ordered a total of four vessels. She was ordered to perform search and rescue duties, as well as coastal patrol.
