= Pasha Liman Base =

Albanian Navy base near Vlorë, Albania

- Vlorë, Albania
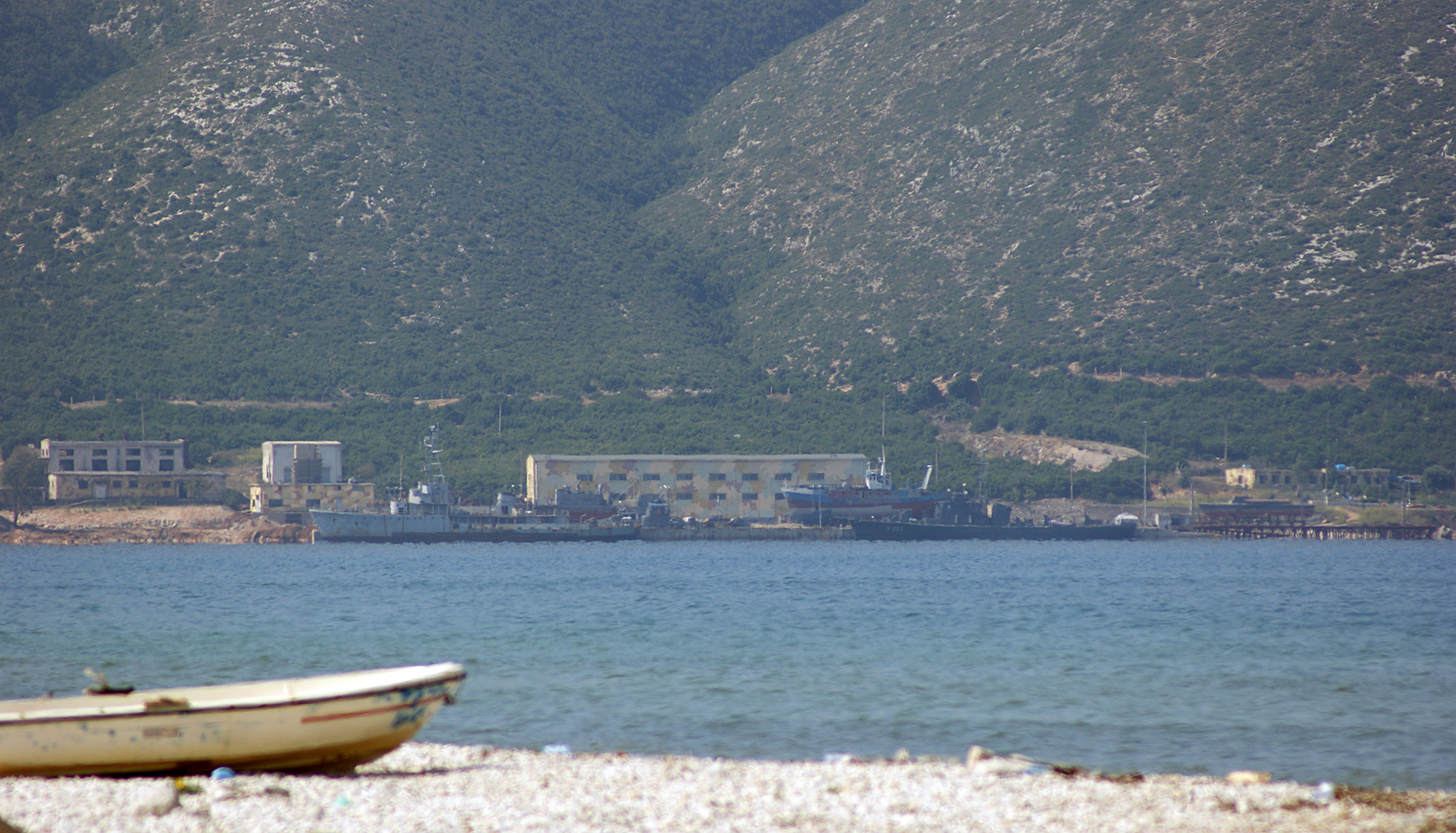
- Pashaliman base from across the Bay of Vlorë

Site information
- Type: Naval Base
- Controlled by: Albanian Navy; Turkish Navy

Location
- Vlorë in Albania
- Location within Albania Location within Europe
- Coordinates: 40.323889°N 19.419167°E

Site history
- In use: Formerly: People's Socialist Republic of Albania; Soviet Union (until 1961) NATO: Albania; Turkey

The Pasha Liman Base, or Pashaliman Base, is an Albanian Navy base south of Vlorë, Albania.

== History ==
=== Cold War history ===
Pashaliman was the only Soviet base in the Mediterranean in the 1950s. It was the hot spot of conflict between the Soviets and the Albanians in 1961 when Albania pulled out of the Warsaw Pact and the dispute of the four Whiskey-class submarine ownership which Albania had seized. Following the collapse of the Communist regime, the base was rebuilt by Turkey and under a bilateral agreement the Turkish Navy has the right to use it.

=== Modern history ===
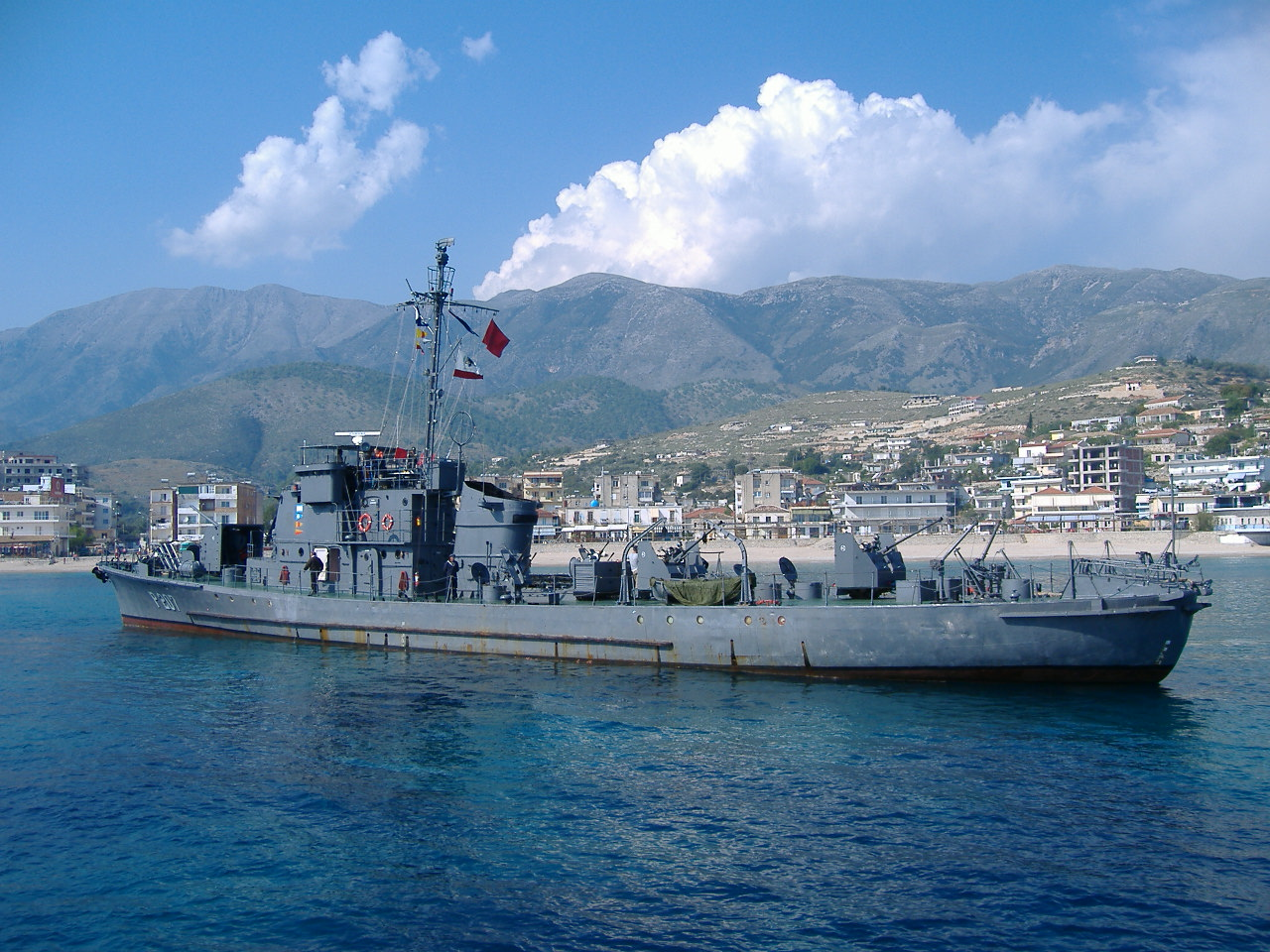
Albania's Kronshtadt-class submarine chaser cruising off Pashaliman

The Albanian-Turkish military cooperation agreement was signed in 1992 and encompassed rebuilding Albania's Pasha Liman Base by Turkey alongside granted access for Turkish use.

Three of the Albanian Navy's four Damen Stan patrol vessels were built at Pashaliman, the most recent completed in 2014. Currently, one of four retired Whiskey-class submarines previously owned by the Soviet Union is still located on the facility alongside Albania's active-duty naval vessels. It can be seen via satellite images of the base, the remaining three were scrapped.

The Naval Force often operates naval exercises in the Bay of Vlorë, out of Pashaliman. This includes exercises with other nations, such as the United Kingdom. The most recent exercise, Sarex '16, took place in April 2016.

== Civilian facilities ==
A civilian naval engineering firm and shipyard also operate out of the military facility, providing a wide range of services.

== See also ==
- Porto Palermo Tunnel
- Albania–Turkey relations
