= Mulzac =

Mulzac is a surname. Notable people with the surname include:

- Hugh Mulzac, American politician, mariner and ship's officer
- Una Mulzac, American bookseller

== See also ==
- Saint Vincent and the Grenadines patrol vessel Captain Hugh Mulzac, Vincentian patrol boat
