= List of ship commissionings in 2019 =

The list of ship commissionings in 2019 includes a chronological list of all ships commissioned in 2019.

	Operator	Ship	Flag	Class and type	Pennant	Other notes
12 January	United States Navy	Wichita			LCS-13	For U.S. Navy
21 January	Indonesian Navy	Semarang		Makassar-class landing platform dock	594	
21 January	Saint Vincent and the Grenadines Coast Guard	Captain Hugh Mulzac		County-class offshore patrol vessel	SVG 01	From Jamaica Defence Force Coast Guard
26 January	United States Navy	Michael Monsoor		Arleigh Burke-class destroyer	DDG-1001	For U.S. Navy
2 February	United States Navy	South Dakota		Virginia-class attack submarine	SSN-790	For U.S. Navy
16 February	United States Navy	Tulsa		Independence-class littoral combat ship	LCS-16	For U.S. Navy
17 February	Islamic Republic of Iran Navy	Fateh		Fateh-class submarine	920	
26 February	Indonesian Navy	Teluk Lada		Teluk Bintuni-class tank landing ship	521	
2 March	United States Navy	Charleston		Independence-class littoral combat ship	LCS-18	For U.S. Navy
27 July	United States Navy	Paul Ignatius		Arleigh Burke-class destroyer	DDG-117	For U.S. Navy
3 August	United States Navy	Billings		Freedom-class littoral combat ship	LCS-15	For U.S. Navy
19 September	Royal Navy	Medway		River-class patrol vessel	P223	For Royal Navy
5 October	United States Navy	Cincinnati		Independence-class littoral combat ship	LCS-20	For U.S. Navy
26 October	United States Navy	Indianapolis		Freedom-class littoral combat ship	LCS-17	For U.S. Navy
28 November	Polish Navy	Ślązak		Offshore patrol vessel	241	For Polish Navy
