= HMJS Middlesex =

Two ships of the JDF Coast Guard have been named for Middlesex, one of the three traditional counties of Jamaica.

- HMJS Middlesex (2005) – a County-class patrol vessel derived from the Damen Stan 4207. In service with the JDF Coast Guard from 2005 to 2017, the Nicaraguan Navy from 2017 to 2019, and the SVG Coast Guard from 2019–
- HMJS Middlesex (2017) – a Damen Stan 4207 patrol vessel in service with the JDF from 2017–

== See also ==
- HMCS Middlesex
