= List of sovereign states without armed forces =

This is a list of sovereign states without armed forces. Dependent territories (such as Bermuda, Guam, and the Northern Mariana Islands) whose defense is the responsibility of another country, or an army alternative are excluded. The term armed forces refers to any government-sponsored defense used to further the domestic and foreign policies of their respective government. Some of the countries listed, such as Iceland and Monaco, have no standing armies but still have a non-police military force.

Many of the 21 countries listed here typically have had a long-standing agreement with a former colonial or protecting power; one example of the latter is the agreement between Monaco and France, which has existed for at least 300 years. Similarly, the Compact of Free Association countries of the Federated States of Micronesia (FSM), the Marshall Islands, and Palau rely on the United States for their defense. They ensure their national security concerns are addressed through annual Joint Committee Meetings to discuss defense matters with the U.S. Indo-Pacific Command. Andorra can request defensive aid if necessary, while Iceland has a unique agreement since 1951 with the United States which requires them to provide defense to Iceland when needed, although permanent armed forces have not been stationed there since 2006.

The remaining countries are responsible for their own defense, and operate either without any armed forces, or with limited armed forces. Some of the countries, such as Costa Rica and Grenada, underwent a process of demilitarization. Other countries were formed without armed forces, such as Samoa over 60 years ago; the primary reason being that they were, or still are, under protection from another nation at their point of independence.

== Sovereign states without armed forces ==
Sovereign states with no official military forces
Country	Details	Ref.
Andorra	Andorra has no standing army but has signed treaties by which Spain and France provide defence assistance and protection. It has a small volunteer army which is purely ceremonial in function. The paramilitary GIPA special forces unit of the Police Corps of Andorra is trained in counter-terrorism and hostage rescue.	
Dominica	Dominica has not had a standing military since 1981. The Commonwealth of Dominica Police Force has a special forces unit and coast guard. In the event of war or other emergencies, the police force can act as a military if so directed by the authorities. Defence is the responsibility of the Regional Security System.	
Grenada	Grenada has not had a standing military since the 1983 disbandment of the People's Revolutionary Army, after the US-led invasion. The Royal Grenada Police Force maintains the paramilitary Special Services Unit for internal security purposes. Maritime security is handled by the Royal Grenada Coast Guard. Defence is the responsibility of the Regional Security System.	
Iceland	Iceland has not had a standing army since 1869, but is an active member of NATO. The Crisis Response Unit is an expeditionary peacekeeping force. There is an extensive militarised Coast Guard incorporating an air defence system, and a police service which maintains a police tactical unit. There is a defense agreement with the United States, which maintained the Iceland Defense Force and Naval Air Station Keflavik in the country from 1951 to 2006. Following its closure, the U.S. announced it would continue to provide for Iceland's defense, but without permanently basing forces in the country. There are also agreements regarding military and other security operations with Norway, Denmark, and other NATO countries.	
Kiribati	Under Article 126 of the Constitution of Kiribati, the only security forces permitted are the police, which maintains a maritime patrol unit for internal security. The unit is equipped with small arms and maintains the Pacific-class patrol boat Teanoai. Defence assistance is provided by Australia and New Zealand under an informal agreement between the three countries.	
Liechtenstein	Liechtenstein abolished its standing army in 1868 because it was deemed too costly. An army is only permitted in times of war, but that situation has not occurred since the Austro-Prussian War in 1866. Liechtenstein maintains a police force with a police tactical unit, equipped with small arms to carry out internal security duties. Defense assistance is provided by Austria and Switzerland under an informal agreement among the three countries.	
Marshall Islands	Since the country's founding, no military has been formed. The police maintain a maritime patrol unit for internal security. The unit is equipped with small arms and maintains the Pacific-class patrol boat Lomor. Under the Compact of Free Association, defense is the responsibility of the United States.	
Federated States of Micronesia	Since the country's founding, no military has been formed. The police maintains a maritime patrol Unit for internal security. The unit is equipped with small arms and maintains three Pacific-class patrol boats: FSS Palikir, FSS Micronesia and FSS Independence. Defense is the responsibility of the United States under the Compact of Free Association.	
Nauru	Since the country's founding, no military has been formed. The Nauru Police Force carries out all internal security duties. Australia is responsible for Nauru's defence under an informal agreement between the two countries.	
Palau	Since the country's founding, no military has been formed. The police maintains a 30-person maritime patrol unit for internal security. The unit is equipped with small arms and maintains the Pacific-class patrol boat Remeliik and the Japanese-donated patrol boat PSS Kedam. Defense assistance is provided by the United States under the Compact of Free Association.	
Saint Lucia	The Royal Saint Lucia Police Force maintain two small paramilitary forces consisting of 116 people, the Special Service Unit, and the Coast Guard, with both carrying out internal security duties. Defence is the responsibility of the Regional Security System.	
Saint Vincent and the Grenadines	The Royal Saint Vincent and the Grenadines Police Force maintain two paramilitary forces with a combined strength of 94 people (as of 2012); the Special Service Unit, and the Coast Guard, which are responsible for internal security and patrolling coastal waters respectively. Virtually all Coast Guard's commanders have been former Royal Navy officers. Defence is the responsibility of the Regional Security System.	
Samoa	Since the country's foundation, no military has been formed. There is a small police force, which maintains a maritime patrol unit for internal security. The unit is equipped with small arms and maintains the Japanese-donated patrol boat Tilafaig and a Guardian-class patrol boat, the Nafanua III. There are defence ties with New Zealand, which is required to consider any request for assistance under the 1962 Treaty of Friendship.	
Solomon Islands	The Solomon Islands have not had a military force since 1946. There is a relatively large police force, which maintains a maritime patrol unit for internal security. The unit is equipped with small arms, and maintains the Pacific-class patrol boats Auki and Lata. Following the outbreak of ethnic violence in 1999, neighbouring countries intervened to restore law and order in 2003. The Regional Assistance Mission to Solomon Islands (RAMSI) was responsible for defence and policing assistance until 30 June 2017.	
Tuvalu	Since the country's foundation, no military has been formed. There is a small police force, which maintains a maritime patrol unit for internal security. The unit is equipped with small arms and maintains the Pacific-class patrol boat Te Mataili II. Australia assumed responsibility for Tuvalu's national security in 2023 in accordance with the Australia–Tuvalu Falepili Union.	
Vanuatu	The relatively large Vanuatu Police Force (VPF) maintains a paramilitary force, the Vanuatu Mobile Forces (VMF), for internal security purposes. The VMF consists of approximately 300 personnel who are equipped with small arms. The VPF also maintains a maritime patrol unit for internal security.	
Vatican City	The Swiss Guard, an armed unit charged with protecting the pope, is officially under the authority of the Holy See rather than the Vatican City. The Vatican City has no formal defense treaty with Italy, as it would violate the former's neutrality, but informally Vatican City is under the protection of the Italian Armed Forces. The Palatine Guard and Noble Guard were abolished in 1970. Internal policing is the responsibility of the Corps of Gendarmerie of Vatican City.	

== Sovereign states with no standing army but limited military ==
Sovereign states with no standing army, but having limited military forces
Country	Details	Ref.
Costa Rica	Article 12 of the Constitution of Costa Rica has forbidden a standing army since 1949, following the Costa Rican Civil War. The Public Force, whose main role includes law enforcement, internal security and command of the Air Vigilance Service, has limited military capacities. The Costa Rica Coast Guard operates directly under the Ministry of Public Security and is not part of the Public Force.	
Mauritius	Mauritius has not had a standing army since independence in 1968. All military, police, and security functions are carried out by 10,000 full-time servicemembers under the command of the Commissioner of Police. The 8,000-strong Mauritius Police Force is responsible for domestic law enforcement. There is also a 1,400-strong Special Mobile Force and a 688-strong National Coast Guard, which are both considered paramilitary units. Both units are equipped with small arms.	
Monaco	Monaco renounced its general military investment in the 17th century because advancements in artillery technology had rendered it defenseless, but still self-identifies as having limited military forces. Although defense is the responsibility of France, two small military units are maintained: the Compagnie des Carabiniers du Prince primarily protects the monarch and judiciary, while the Corps des Sapeurs-Pompiers is responsible for civil defense and fire fighting. Both units are well-trained and equipped with small arms. In addition to the military, an armed national police force is maintained for internal security purposes.	
Panama	Panama abolished its army in 1990, which was confirmed by a constitutional change in 1994. The Panamanian Public Forces include the National Police, National Border Service, National Aeronaval Service, and Institutional Protection Service, which have some military capabilities.	

== See also ==
- List of countries with highest military expenditures
- List of countries by number of military and paramilitary personnel
- List of militaries by country
- List of militaries that recruit foreigners
