= Fireboats of Jamaica =

Fire-fighting watercraft in Jamaica

The Jamaican Fire Brigade operates several fireboats of Jamaica. According to a 2003 article in the Jamaica Gleaner the three fireboats then nominally operated by the Fire Brigade were all in a state of disrepair, and had all been out of service for months—or in the case of one vessel—years. According to another Gleaner article the stations were dangerously over-run with rats and other vermin.

In 2005 the Jamaica Star reported that after the fireboat assigned to the Kingston Fire Boat Station had been out of service for most of 2004—being sent for repair four separate times, the staff were assigned to other duties when the fireboat was placed permanently offline.

By 2012, the fireboat that served Montego Bay, Jamaica's second most important port, had been without a fireboat for over five years, as the previous boat had been written off as not worth repairing, but had yet to be replaced.

Both the mayor of Montego Bay, Glendon Harris, and Jamaica Senator Robert Montague have called for the urgent supply of new fireboats.

In November 2013 Alrick Hacker a Senior Deputy Superintendent of the Fire Brigade, defended the Brigade's replacement plans and outlined the interim measures in place until the new boats were in service. Jamaica's three new Jamaican Coast Guard patrol cutters all mount a water cannon in their bow, and Hacker said the Coast Guard had been requested to help out until the Brigade's new fireboats were ready. He said the Police Marine units also had some firefighting capability, and they too had been asked to help out. He asserted that modern cruise ships, the foreign vessels of most acute concern, were built more fire-safe than in the past, and had the capability to fight their own fires, to a certain extent.

Hacker asserted that new technology would allow the Fire Brigade to replace their older, relatively large vessels with smaller, faster, more capable vessels, that would be cheaper to operate and to maintain.

In 2018 the Fire Brigade acquired two new fireboats.
