= Special Intervention Unit (Costa Rica) =

Special forces unit

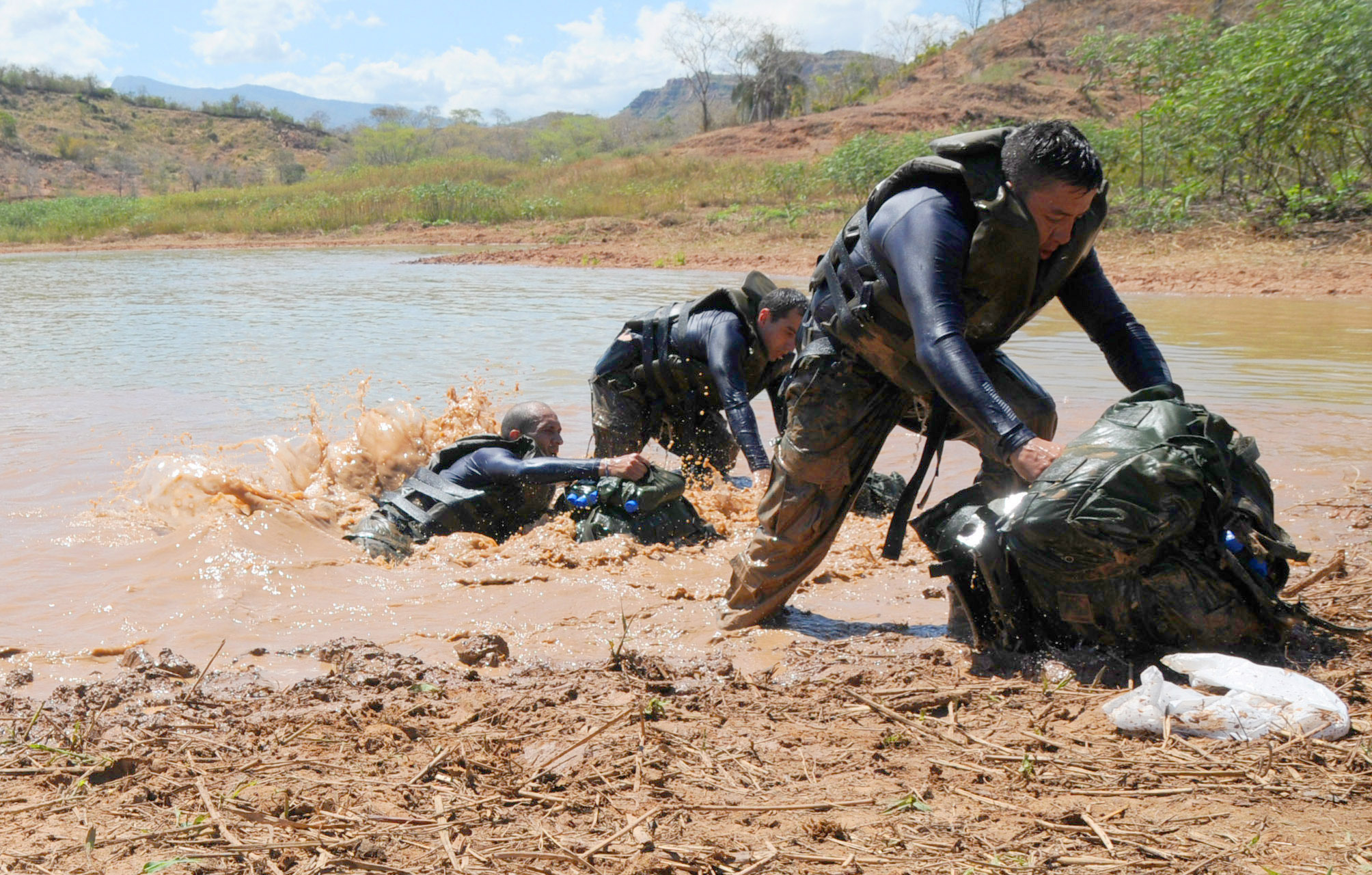
UEI commandos at the Fuerzas Comando Aquatics event at Nilo, Colombia

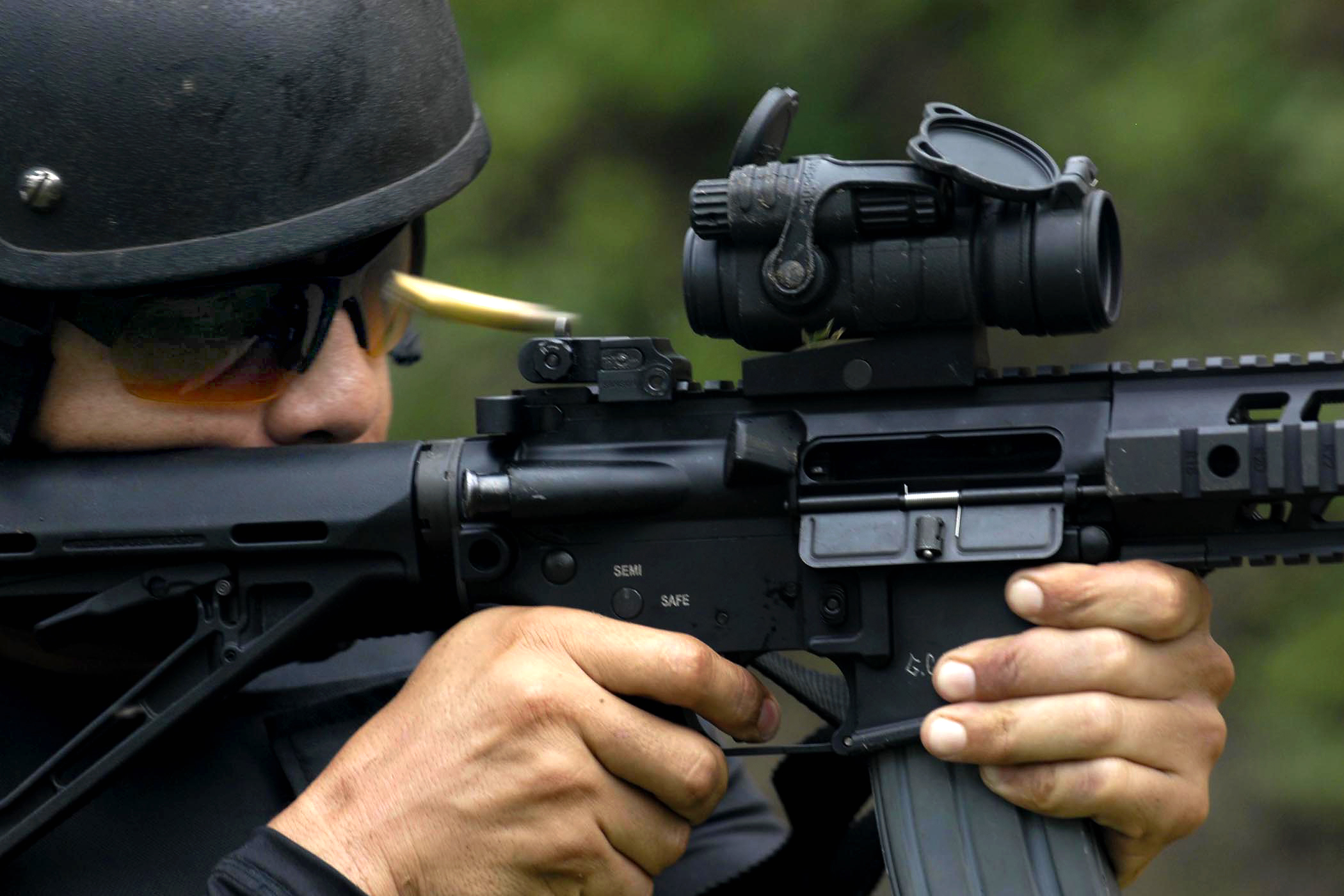
A UEI commando firing an AR-15 during training.

The Special Intervention Unit (Spanish: Unidad Especial de Intervencion, UEI) is a special forces unit under the control of Costa Rica's Department of Intelligence and Security. It has been described as being a company-sized commando unit. The unit is tasked with performing missions that deal with counterterrorism, hostage rescue, counter drug trafficking, and riot control. The UEI was formed in 1982 after a group of operatives went to train with Israeli Special Forces that were in Panama. As of 2014, it was estimated to have around 70 members.

== See also ==
- Public Force of Costa Rica
- Air Vigilance Service
- Panamanian Public Forces
