= SS Cornelia P. Spencer =

U.S. WWI Liberty ship

History

United States
- Name: Cornelia P. Spencer
- Namesake: Cornelia Phillips Spencer
- Builder: North Carolina Shipbuilding Company, Wilmington, North Carolina
- Yard number: 89
- Way number: 8
- Laid down: 29 March 1943
- Launched: 24 April 1943
- Out of service: 1943
- Fate: Sunk by U-188, 1943

General characteristics
- Type: Liberty ship
- Tonnage: 7,000 long tons deadweight (DWT)
- Length: 441 ft 6 in (134.57 m)
- Beam: 56 ft 11 in (17.35 m)
- Draft: 27 ft 9 in (8.46 m)
- Propulsion: Two oil-fired boilers; Triple expansion steam engine; Single screw; 2,500 hp (1,864 kW)
- Speed: 11 knots (20 km/h; 13 mph)
- Capacity: 9,140 tons cargo
- Complement: 68
- Armament: 2 × Stern-mounted 3 in (76 mm) deck gun; 8 x 20mm AA guns

SS Cornelia P. Spencer (MC contract 911) was a Liberty ship built in the United States during World War II. She was named after Cornelia Phillips Spencer, an influential writer and journalist in North Carolina during the Reconstruction era.

The ship was laid down by North Carolina Shipbuilding Company in their Cape Fear River yard on March 29, 1943, and launched on April 24, 1943. She was chartered to the A. L. Burbank & Company, Ltd by the War Shipping Administration.

== Loss ==
Spencer was sailing unescorted from Aden to Durban when she was struck by three torpedoes from the German submarine U-188. After the first struck, the Naval Armed Guard detachment forced U-188 to submerge with gunfire. A second torpedo struck the stationary vessel an hour later and it began sinking. After the crew had abandoned ship the third torpedo hit it. Survivors were rescued by HMS Relentless and SS Sandown Castle. Some landed on the coast of Somalia.
