= Military of Saint Vincent and the Grenadines =

Saint Vincent and the Grenadines have no regular military force; the Special Service Unit and Coast Guard are both under the command of the Royal Saint Vincent and the Grenadines Police Force. As of 2010, there are an estimated 31,489 males age 16–49 available for military service, and an estimated 28,518 males age 16–49, fit for military service. Each year, approximately 1169 males and 1224 females reach military age, as estimated in 2010.

The Royal Saint Vincent and the Grenadines Police Force receives training from the United States Southern Command. The United States Armed Forces consider Saint Vincent and the Grenadines as a partner nation in the Caribbean, along with St. Lucia.
