= County-class patrol vessel =

Type of Jamaican Coast Guard vessel

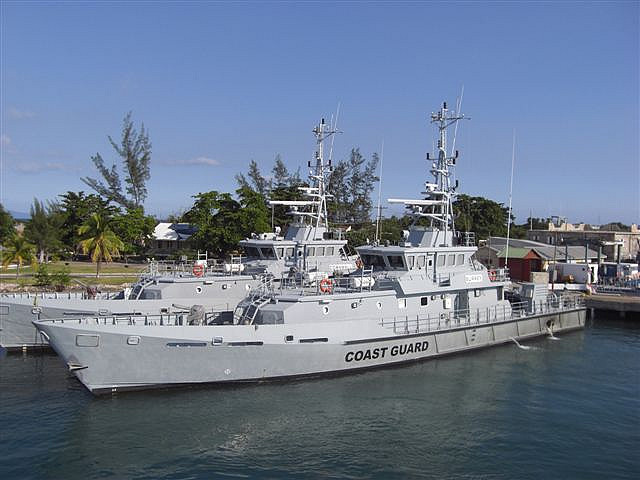
- Two of the Jamaican Coast Guard patrol vessels

Class overview
- Name: County class
- Builders: Damen Group
- Operators: Jamaica Defence Force Coast Guard
- Built: 2005–2006
- In commission: 2005 – present
- Completed: 3
- Active: 1

General characteristics
- Type: Damen Stan 4207 patrol vessel
- Length: 42.8 m (140 ft 5 in)
- Speed: 26 knots (48 km/h; 30 mph)
- Complement: 17

The County class is a class of offshore patrol vessels built for the Jamaica Defence Force Coast Guard (JDF). Based on the Dutch Damen Stan 4207 patrol vessel, the first vessel entered service in 2005. Three were originally purchased, but only one remains in service with the JDF. In 2017, an additional two vessels were purchased and both remain in service as of 2023. The Jamaican vessels are equipped with a stern launching ramp, capable of deploying and retrieving a small jet boat, for rescue or pursuit. The vessels' bridge electronics were supplied by Alphatron Marine.

== Ships in class ==
The three original vessels of the County class are Cornwall (2005), Middlesex (2005), and Surrey. They were delivered in 2005 and 2006. Two additional ships were ordered in 2016 and commissioned the next year, also with the names Cornwall (2016) and Middlesex (2017).

Name	Ship Builder	Commissioned	Status	Note
HMJS Cornwall (2005)	Damen Shipyard	October 27, 2005	In service with Nicaraguan Navy	
HMJS Middlesex (2005)	Damen Shipyard	April 7, 2006	In service with SVG Coast Guard	
HMJS Surrey	Damen Shipyard	June 26, 2007	In service with JDF Coast Guard	
HMJS Cornwall (2016)	Damen Shipyard	January 2017	In service with JDF Coast Guard	
HMJS Middlesex (2017)	Damen Shipyard	January 2017	In service with JDF Coast Guard	

== Service history ==
In 2012 the Jamaican Fire Brigade had only one of its four fireboats operational, and had requested that the County-class patrol vessels help fill in until its more modern replacement vessels were delivered.

In 2017 Nicaragua purchased the original Cornwall and Middlesex. In 2019, Middlesex was purchased from the Nicaraguan Navy by the Saint Vincent and the Grenadines Coast Guard and renamed Captain Hugh Mulzac.
