= A. L. Burbank & Company, Ltd =

Former US Shipbuilding company

A. L. Burbank & Company, Ltd.
- Founded: 1928
- Founder: Abram Lincoln Burbank
- Fate: Chapter 7 bankruptcy in 2014
- Headquarters: New York City
- Key people: Peter Burbank, Peter Borch, Franklin W.L. Tsao, Mr. Caramella

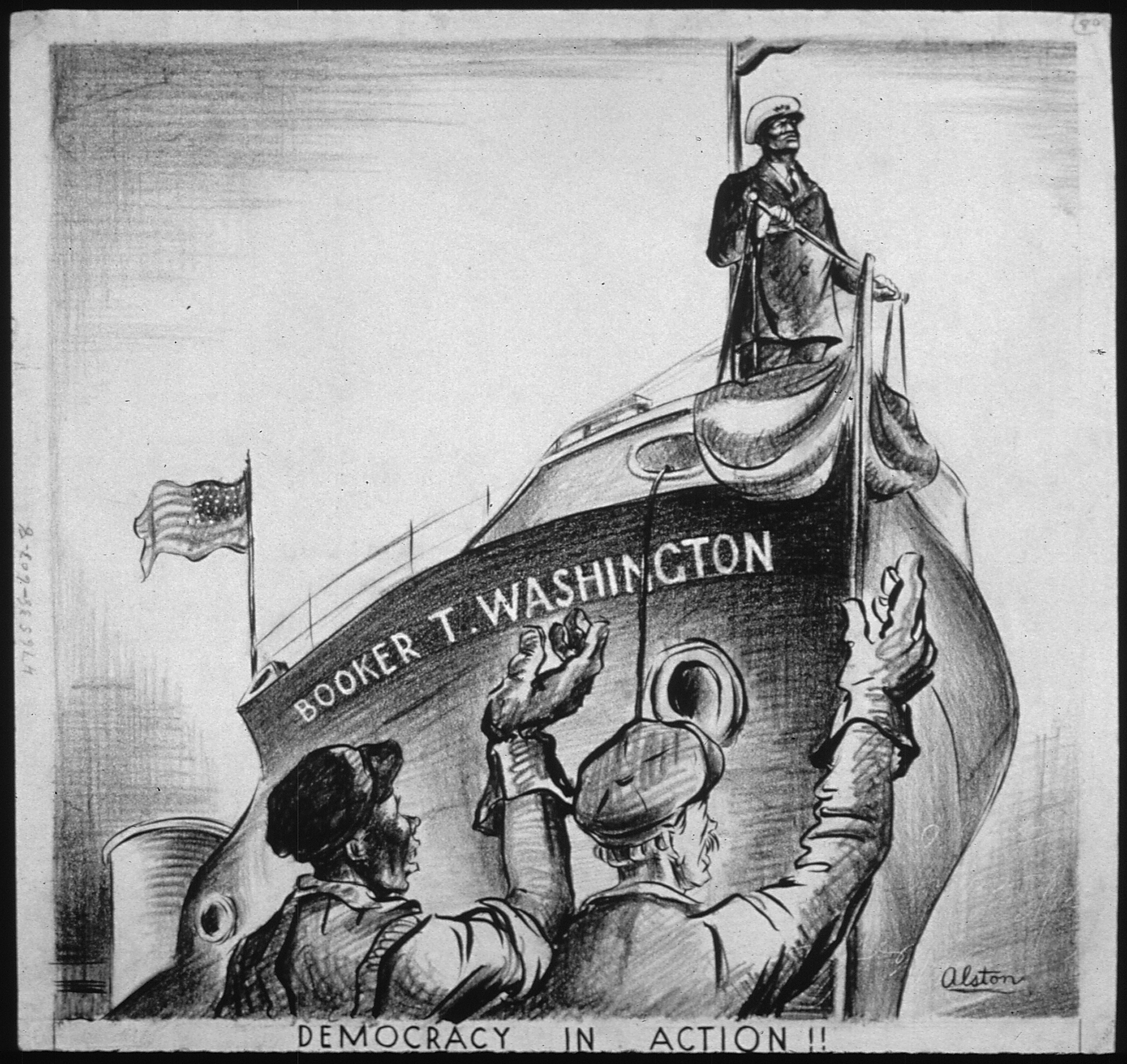
SS Booker T. Washington art by Charles Alston

Liberty ship of World War II

A. L. Burbank & Company, Ltd. of New York City was a shipping company founded by Abram Lincoln Burbank on October 16, 1928. A. L. Burbank & Company, Ltd. operated dry bulk cargo ships. Abram Lincoln Burbank worked for and learned the shipping trade at Bull lines of the A. H. Bull Steamship Company in 1917.

Peter Burbank, Abram Lincoln Burbank son, took over the company as president in 1955. In October 1978 Franklin W.L. Tsao became president of the company, in a 50 year anniversary celebration. Tsao has worked at the company since 1968

A. L. Burbank & Company, Ltd. was active with charter shipping with the Maritime Commission and War Shipping Administration. During wartime, the A. L. Burbank & Company, Ltd. operated Liberty ships. The ship was run by its A. L. Burbank & Company, Ltd. and the US Navy supplied United States Navy Armed Guards to man the deck guns and radio. The most common armament mounted on these merchant ships were the MK II 20mm Oerlikon autocannon and the 3"/50, 4"/50, and 5"/38 deck guns.

A. L. Burbank & Company, Ltd. closed in 2014.

== Ships ==
  - Ships:

A. L. Burbank & Company, Ltd. operated ships"

- Coastal Stevedore a type C1 cargo ship
  - Liberty Ships:
- SS Edward M. House
- SS Henry B. Plant
- SS Howard A. Kelly
- C. Francis Jenkins
- Carter Braxton
- Amasa Delano
- Anson Jones
- Earl A.Bloomquist
- Edward M.House
- SS Booker T. Washington
- SS Benjamin H. Hill
- SS Cornelia P. Spencer

== See also ==
- Calmar Steamship Company
- Bethlehem Transportation Corporation
- World War II United States Merchant Navy
