= SS Benjamin H. Hill =

World War II Liberty ship of the United States

History

United States
- Name: Benjamin H. Hill
- Namesake: Benjamin H. Hill
- Ordered: as type (EC2-S-C1) hull, MC hull 1514
- Builder: J.A. Jones Construction, Brunswick, Georgia
- Cost: $1,247,046
- Yard number: 130
- Way number: 2
- Laid down: 16 December 1943
- Launched: 7 February 1944
- Sponsored by: Mrs. John D. Pellett
- Completed: 19 February 1944
- Identification: Call Signal: KVOT
- Fate: Laid up in National Defense Reserve Fleet, James River Group, Lee Hall, Virginia, 8 October 1947; Sold for scrapping, 2 February 1971

General characteristics
- Class & type: Liberty ship; type EC2-S-C1, standard
- Tonnage: 10,865 LT DWT; 7,176 GRT
- Displacement: 3,380 long tons (3,434 t) (light); 14,245 long tons (14,474 t) (max)
- Length: 441 feet 6 inches (135 m) oa; 416 feet (127 m) pp; 427 feet (130 m) lwl
- Beam: 57 feet (17 m)
- Draft: 27 ft 9.25 in (8.4646 m)
- Installed power: 2 × Oil fired 450 °F (232 °C) boilers, operating at 220 psi (1,500 kPa); 2,500 hp (1,900 kW)
- Propulsion: 1 × triple-expansion steam engine, (manufactured by Filer and Stowell, Milwaukee, Wisconsin); 1 × screw propeller
- Speed: 11.5 knots (21.3 km/h; 13.2 mph)
- Capacity: 562,608 cubic feet (15,931 m^{3}) (grain); 499,573 cubic feet (14,146 m^{3}) (bale)
- Complement: 38–62 USMM; 21–40 USNAG
- Armament: Varied by ship; Bow-mounted 3-inch (76 mm)/50-caliber gun; Stern-mounted 4-inch (102 mm)/50-caliber gun; 2–8 × single 20-millimeter (0.79 in) Oerlikon anti-aircraft (AA) cannons and/or, 2–8 × 37-millimeter (1.46 in) M1 AA guns

SS Benjamin H. Hill was a Liberty ship built in the United States during World War II. She was named after Benjamin H. Hill, a Confederate senator and later a US representative, US senator from the state of Georgia.

== Construction ==
Benjamin H. Hill was laid down on 16 December 1943, under a Maritime Commission (MARCOM) contract, MC hull 1514, by J.A. Jones Construction, Brunswick, Georgia; she was sponsored by Mrs. John D. Pellett, and launched on 7 February 1944.

== History ==
She was allocated to the A. L. Burbank & Company, on 19 February 1944. On 8 October 1947, she was laid up in the National Defense Reserve Fleet in the James River Group, Lee Hall, Virginia. On 20 May 1954, she was withdrawn from the fleet to be loaded with grain under the "Grain Program 1954", she returned loaded with grain on 28 May 1954. She was again withdrawn from the fleet on 4 April 1959, to have the grain unloaded, she returned empty on 11 April 1959. On 18 November 1960, she was withdrawn from the fleet to be loaded with grain under the "Grain Program 1960", she returned loaded with grain on 7 December 1960. She was again withdrawn from the fleet on 19 May 1963, to have the grain unloaded, she returned empty on 22 May 1963. On 2 February 1971, she was sold, along with the ship Monterey, to Hierros Andes, S.A., for $172,500, for scrapping, she was delivered on 9 September 1971.

== Bibliography ==
- "Jones Construction, Brunswick GA". www.ShipbuildingHistory.com. 13 October 2010.
- "Liberty Ships – World War II".
- Maritime Administration. "Benjamin H. Hill". Ship History Database Vessel Status Card. U.S. Department of Transportation, Maritime Administration. Archived from the original on 12 December 2019.
- Davies, James (May 2004). "Specifications (As-Built)" (PDF). p. 23.
- "SS Benjamin H. Hill".
