= SS Howard A. Kelly =

Liberty ship of WWII

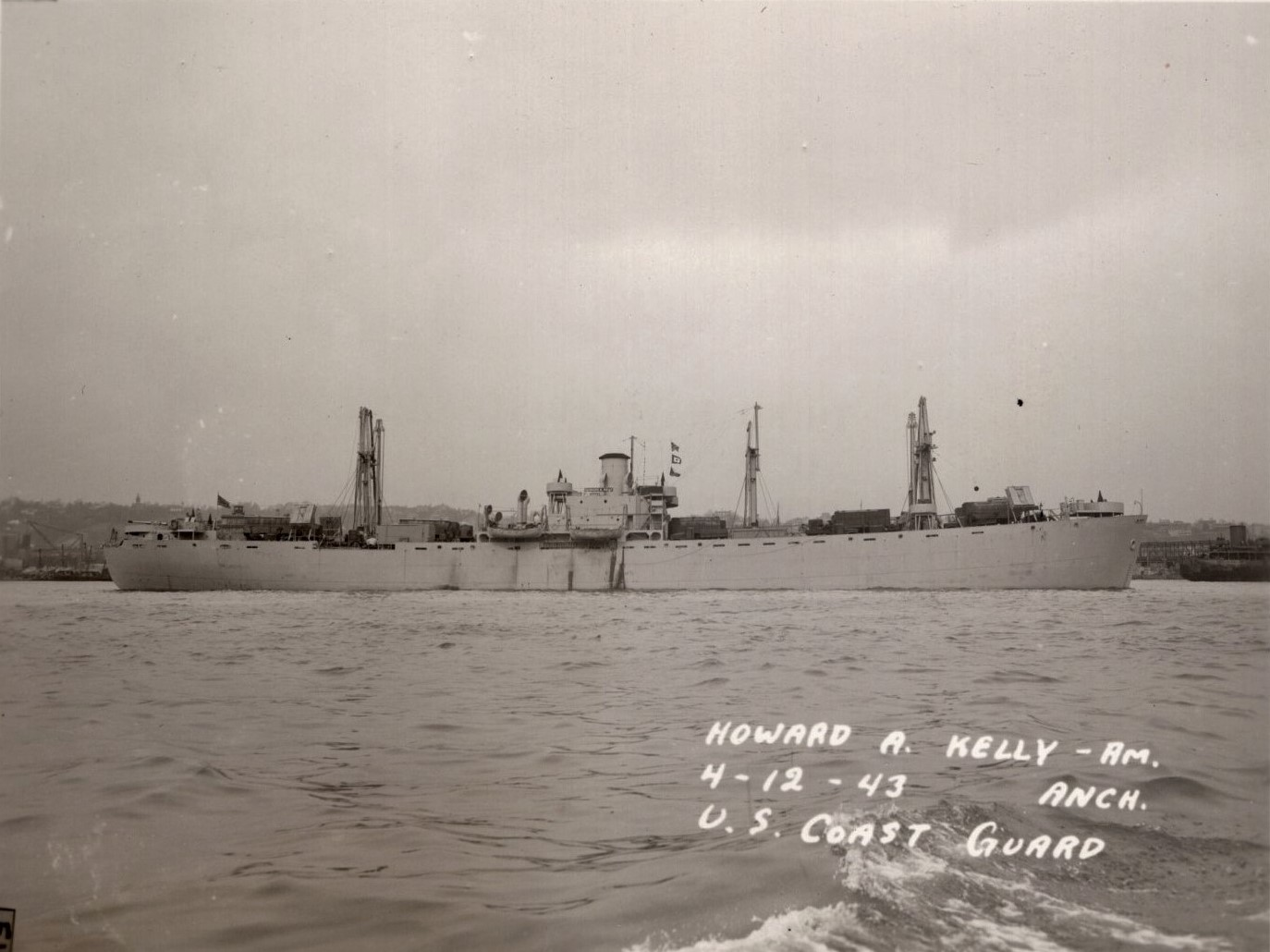
- Liberty ship SS Howard A. Kelly 12 April 1943

History

United States
- Name: Howard A. Kelly
- Namesake: Howard A. Kelly
- Owner: War Shipping Administration (WSA)
- Operator: A.L. Burbank & Co., Ltd.
- Ordered: as type (EC2-S-C1) hull, MCE hull 955
- Awarded: 30 January 1942
- Builder: Bethlehem-Fairfield Shipyard, Baltimore, Maryland
- Cost: $1,049,141
- Yard number: 2105
- Way number: 4
- Laid down: 8 February 1943
- Launched: 18 March 1943
- Completed: 29 March 1943
- Identification: Call sign: KKNP
- Fate: Laid up in reserve fleet, 2 November 1948, sold 27 May 1949

United States
- Name: Tainaron
- Owner: Actium Shipping Corp.
- Acquired: 27 May 1949
- Fate: Sold foreign, November 1954

Liberia
- Name: Aktion
- Owner: Ronda Compania Maritime, S.A.
- Fate: Reflagged, 1960

Greece
- Name: Aktion
- Owner: Ronda Compania Maritime, S.A.
- Fate: Reflagged, 1966

Liberia
- Name: Olympian
- Owner: Ronda Compania Maritime, S.A.
- Fate: Sold, 1968

Liberia
- Name: Binky
- Owner: Amicus SS Co.
- Fate: Scrapped, 1969

General characteristics
- Class & type: Liberty ship; type EC2-S-C1, standard
- Tonnage: 10,865 LT DWT; 7,176 GRT
- Displacement: 3,380 long tons (3,434 t) (light); 14,245 long tons (14,474 t) (max)
- Length: 441 feet 6 inches (135 m) oa; 416 feet (127 m) pp; 427 feet (130 m) lwl
- Beam: 57 feet (17 m)
- Draft: 27 ft 9.25 in (8.4646 m)
- Installed power: 2 × Oil fired 450 °F (232 °C) boilers, operating at 220 psi (1,500 kPa); 2,500 hp (1,900 kW)
- Propulsion: 1 × triple-expansion steam engine, (manufactured by General Machinery Corp., Hamilton, Ohio); 1 × screw propeller
- Speed: 11.5 knots (21.3 km/h; 13.2 mph)
- Capacity: 562,608 cubic feet (15,931 m^{3}) (grain); 499,573 cubic feet (14,146 m^{3}) (bale)
- Complement: 38–62 USMM; 21–40 USNAG
- Armament: Varied by ship; Bow-mounted 3-inch (76 mm)/50-caliber gun; Stern-mounted 4-inch (102 mm)/50-caliber gun; 2–8 × single 20-millimeter (0.79 in) Oerlikon anti-aircraft (AA) cannons and/or, 2–8 × 37-millimeter (1.46 in) M1 AA guns

General characteristics
- Tonnage: 8,953 GRT (1962-1969)

SS Howard A. Kelly was an American Liberty ship built in 1943 for service in World War II. Her namesake was Howard Atwood Kelly, a famed surgical gynecologist and one of the "Big Four" founders of Johns Hopkins Hospital.

== Design ==
Like other Liberty ships, she was 441 feet (134 m) long and 57 feet (17 m) wide, carried 7,176 GRT of cargo and had a top speed of 11.5 knots (21.3 km/h; 13.2 mph). Most Liberty ships were named after prominent deceased Americans.

== Construction ==
Howard A. Kelly was laid down on 8 February 1943, under a Maritime Commission (MARCOM) contract, MCE hull 955, by the Bethlehem-Fairfield Shipyard, Baltimore, Maryland; she was launched on 18 March 1943.

== History ==
She was allocated to the A.L. Burbank & Co., Ltd., on 29 March 1943.

On 2 November 1948, she was laid up in the Beaumont Reserve Fleet, in Beaumont, Texas. On 27 Mayy 1949, she was sold to Actium SS Corp., and renamed Tainaron. She was sold in November 1954, to Ronda Compania Maritime, S.A., reflagged in Liberia, and renamed Aktion. In 1960, while still owned by the same company, she was renamed, Olympos, and reflagged in Greece. In 1966, she was again flagged in Liberia, and renamed Olympian. In 1968, she was sold to Amicus SS Co., and renamed Binky. She was scrapped in Taiwan, in 1969.

== Bibliography ==
- "Bethlehem-Fairfield, Baltimore MD". www.ShipbuildingHistory.com. 7 August 2021.
- Maritime Administration. "Howard A. Kelly". Ship History Database Vessel Status Card. U.S. Department of Transportation, Maritime Administration.
- Davies, James (May 2004). "Specifications (As-Built)" (PDF). p. 23.
- "SS Howard A. Kelly".
- Sawyer, L.A.; Mitchell, W.H. (1985). The Liberty Ships. Bury St. Edmunds, Suffolk, Great Britain: St. Edmundsbury Press Ltd. ISBN 1850440492.
