= Royal Saint Vincent and the Grenadines Police Force =

Law enforcement agency

- Abbreviation: RSVGPF

Agency overview
- Formed: January 4, 1999
- Employees: 691

Jurisdictional structure
- National agency: VC
- Operations jurisdiction: VC
- Area: 150 square miles (390 km^{2})
- Population: 109,000
- General nature: Civilian police

Operational structure
- Agency executive: Colin John
- Parent agency: Ministry of National Security

Facilities
- Stations: 23

Website
- Official Website

The Royal Saint Vincent and the Grenadines Police Force (RSVGPF) is the national police force of Saint Vincent and the Grenadines; it was founded in 1999. The Commissioner of Police is Colin John, who commands 691 police officers and civilian employees, in 23 police stations, who serve a resident population of 109,000.

The RSVGPF maintain two paramilitary forces: the Special Service Unit and the Coast Guard; both are responsible for internal security. Defence is the responsibility of the Regional Security System. There is also one non-policing organisation under the command of the RSVGPF Fire Brigade, which is currently directed by Inspector Joel James.

== See also ==
- Saint Vincent and the Grenadines
- Military of Saint Vincent and the Grenadines
- List of countries without armed forces
