= USS Pinellas =

Cargo ship of the United States Navy

History

United States
- Name: Coastal Stevedore (1944–1945, 1945–); Pinellas (1945)
- Namesake: Pinellas County, Florida
- Ordered: as type (C1-M-AV1) hull, MC hull 2156
- Builder: Globe Shipbuilding Co., Superior, Wisconsin
- Yard number: 123
- Launched: 22 December 1944
- Completed: 3 December 1945
- Acquired: 3 March 1945
- Commissioned: Returned to the US Maritime Commission (MARCOM) prior to commissioning
- Identification: Hull symbol: AK-202; Code letters: NXMT
- Fate: Returned to MARCOM, 3 December 1945

United States
- Name: Coastal Stevedore
- Owner: MARCOM
- Operator: A. H. Bull & Company (1945); Bull Insular Lines, Inc. (1946); A. L. Burbank & Company (1947)
- Acquired: 3 December 1945
- In service: 3 December 1945
- Out of service: 2 December 1947
- Fate: Sold, 13 January 1948

Cuba
- Name: Coastal Stevedor
- Acquired: 1 January 1948
- Identification: IMO number: 5033909
- Fate: Scrapped, 1980

General characteristics
- Class & type: Alamosa-class cargo ship
- Type: C1-M-AV1
- Tonnage: 5,032 long tons deadweight (DWT)
- Displacement: 2,382 long tons (2,420 t) (standard); 7,450 long tons (7,570 t) (full load)
- Length: 388 ft 8 in (118.47 m)
- Beam: 50 ft (15 m)
- Draft: 21 ft 1 in (6.43 m)
- Installed power: 1 × Nordberg, TSM 6 diesel engine; 1,750 shp (1,300 kW)
- Propulsion: 1 × propeller
- Speed: 11.5 kn (21.3 km/h; 13.2 mph)
- Capacity: 3,945 t (3,883 long tons) DWT; 9,830 cu ft (278 m^{3}) (refrigerated); 227,730 cu ft (6,449 m^{3}) (non-refrigerated)
- Complement: 15 Officers; 70 Enlisted
- Armament: 1 × 3 in (76 mm)/50-caliber dual-purpose gun (DP); 6 × 20 mm (0.8 in) Oerlikon anti-aircraft (AA) cannons

USS Pinellas (AK-202) was an Alamosa-class cargo ship that was constructed for the U.S. Navy during the closing period of World War II. By the time she was scheduled for commissioning, the war's end caused her to be declared "excess to needs" and she was returned to the U.S. Government and struck by the Navy.

== Construction ==
Pinellas was laid down under Maritime Commission contract, MC hull 2156, by Globe Shipbuilding Co., Superior, Wisconsin. She was transferred to the Navy in March 1945. Pinellas was scheduled for commissioning. However, because of the Allied victory in the Pacific Ocean theatre of operations, her commissioning was cancelled.

== Merchant service ==
Pinellas was ordered returned to the US Maritime Commission for disposal. Her name subsequently reverted Coastal Stevedore. Merchant Service A. H. Bull Steamship Company starting 3 December 1945, at New Orleans. Operated under a charter to Bull Insular Lines starting 5 July 1946. Operated by A. L. Burbank & Company, starting 12 February 1947, at New York. Coastal Stevedor was old to the government of Cuba. On 1 January 1948, she was sold to Cuba. She was scrapped in 1980.

== Notes ==
Citations

== Bibliography ==
Online resources

- "C1 Cargo Ships". www.ShipbuildingHistory.com. 28 August 2009.
- "USS Pinellas (AK-202)". NavSource. 24 June 2011.
- "Coastal Competitor". United States Department of Transportation. Archived from the original on November 4, 2016.
