= SS Edward M. House =

Liberty ship of WWII

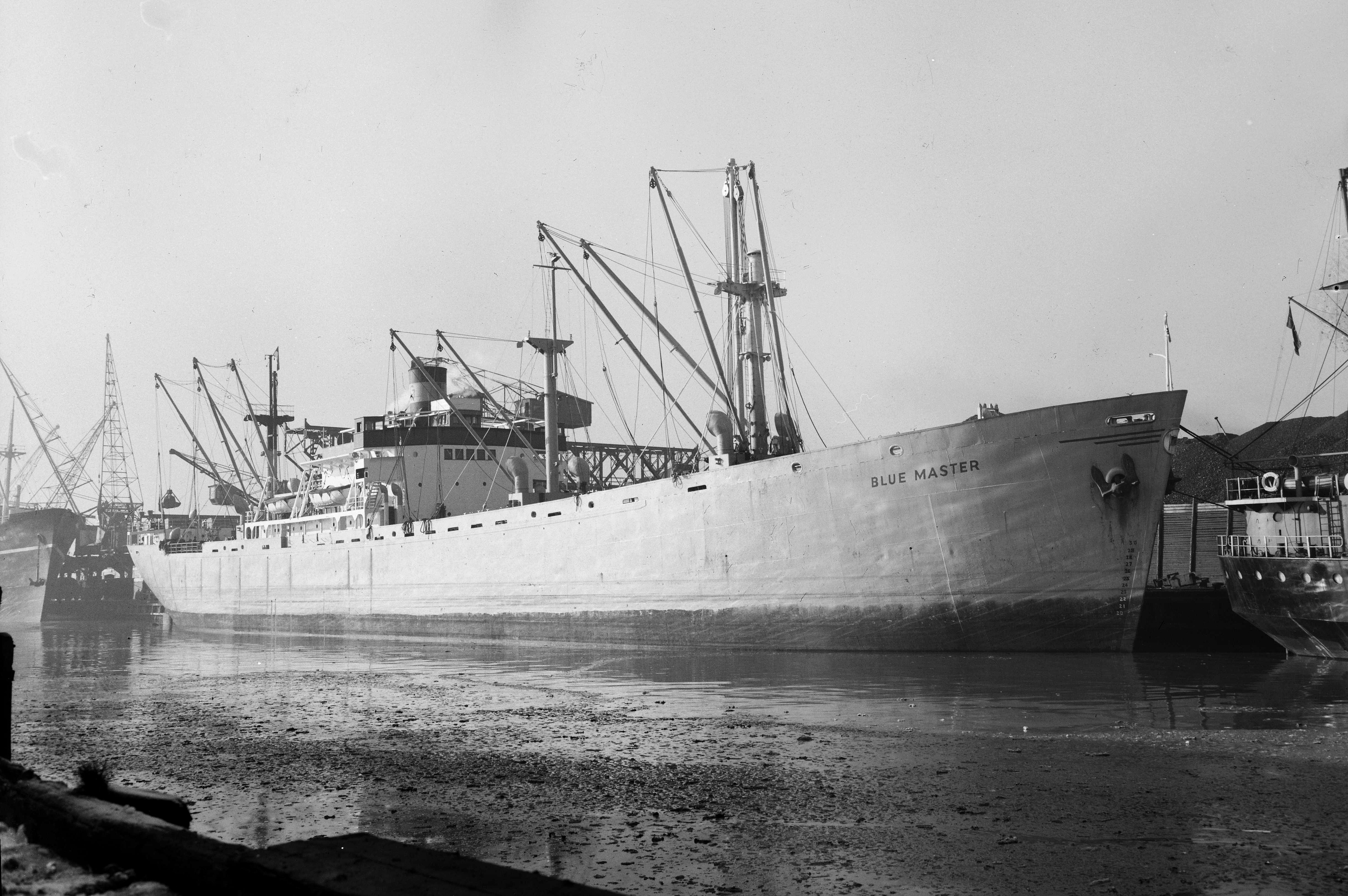
- As Blue Master in 1952

History

United States
- Name: Edward M. House
- Namesake: Edward M. House
- Owner: War Shipping Administration (WSA)
- Operator: A.L. Burbank & Co., Ltd.
- Ordered: as type (EC2-S-C1) hull, MC hull 1209
- Builder: St. Johns River Shipbuilding Company, Jacksonville, Florida
- Cost: $1,534,499
- Yard number: 17
- Way number: 5
- Laid down: 21 August 1943
- Launched: 23 October 1943
- Sponsored by: Miss Irene F. Long
- Completed: 4 November 1943
- Identification: Call sign: KUJL; IMO number: 5089829
- Fate: Sold for commercial use, 7 July 1947, removed from fleet, 15 July 1947

Norway
- Name: Blue Master
- Owner: Rederi A/S Vindeggen (1947); Skibs A/S Golden West (1947–1954)
- Operator: A.F. Klaveness & Co. (1947–1948); J.H.Andersen (1948–1954)
- Fate: Sold, 1954

Liberia
- Name: Dicoronia
- Owner: Bahia Salinas Cia Nav
- Operator: Goulandris Bros.
- Fate: Reflagged, 1967

Greece
- Name: Dicoronia
- Fate: Sold for scrapping, 1970

General characteristics
- Class & type: Liberty ship; type EC2-S-C1, standard
- Tonnage: 10,865 LT DWT; 7,176 GRT
- Displacement: 3,380 long tons (3,434 t) (light); 14,245 long tons (14,474 t) (max)
- Length: 441 feet 6 inches (135 m) oa; 416 feet (127 m) pp; 427 feet (130 m) lwl
- Beam: 57 feet (17 m)
- Draft: 27 ft 9.25 in (8.4646 m)
- Installed power: 2 × Oil fired 450 °F (232 °C) boilers, operating at 220 psi (1,500 kPa); 2,500 hp (1,900 kW)
- Propulsion: 1 × triple-expansion steam engine, (manufactured by General Machinery Corp., Hamilton, Ohio); 1 × screw propeller
- Speed: 11.5 knots (21.3 km/h; 13.2 mph)
- Capacity: 562,608 cubic feet (15,931 m^{3}) (grain); 499,573 cubic feet (14,146 m^{3}) (bale)
- Complement: 38–62 USMM; 21–40 USNAG
- Armament: Varied by ship; Bow-mounted 3-inch (76 mm)/50-caliber gun; Stern-mounted 4-inch (102 mm)/50-caliber gun; 2–8 × single 20-millimeter (0.79 in) Oerlikon anti-aircraft (AA) cannons and/or, 2–8 × 37-millimeter (1.46 in) M1 AA guns

SS Edward M. House was a Liberty ship built in the United States during World War II. She was named after Edward M. House, an American diplomat, and an adviser to President Woodrow Wilson.

== Construction ==
Edward M. House was laid down on 21 August 1943, under a Maritime Commission (MARCOM) contract, MC hull 1209, by the St. Johns River Shipbuilding Company, Jacksonville, Florida; she was sponsored by Miss Irene F. Long, the confidential assistant to Rear Admiral Howard L. Vickery, and was launched on 23 October 1943.

== History ==
She was allocated to A. L. Burbank & Company, Ltd, on 4 November 1943. She took part in the invasion of Normandy, June 1944. On 30 June 1944, Edward M. House was torpedoed or mined in the English Channel. On 20 February 1946, she was allocated to the Japanese government until 16 December 1946, when she was laid up in the National Defense Reserve Fleet, Astoria, Oregon. She was sold for commercial use, 7 July 1947, to Rederi A/S Vindeggen. She was removed from the fleet on 15 July 1947. Edward M. House was renamed Blue Master and reflagged in Norway. In 1954, she was sold to Bahia Salinas Cia Nav, renamed Dicoronia and reflagged in Liberia. In 1967, she was reflagged in Greece, and finally in 1970 she was sold for scrap in Shanghai, China.

== Bibliography ==
- "St. John's River Shipbuilding, Jacksonville FL". www.ShipbuildingHistory.com. 16 October 2010.
- Maritime Administration. "Edward M. House". Ship History Database Vessel Status Card. U.S. Department of Transportation, Maritime Administration.
- Davies, James (May 2004). "Specifications (As-Built)" (PDF). p. 23.
- "SS Edward M. House".
