= Public Force of Costa Rica =

National police of Costa Rica

Public Force of Costa Rica Fuerza Pública de Costa Rica

Agency overview
- Formed: 1996; 30 years ago

Jurisdictional structure
- Operations jurisdiction: Costa Rica
- General nature: Gendarmerie; Civilian police
- Specialist jurisdictions: National border patrol, security, integrity; Paramilitary law enforcement, counter insurgency, riot control

Operational structure
- Parent agency: Ministry of Public Security
- Child agency: Air Vigilance Service

Notables
- Anniversary: 1 December (Army Abolition Day)

Website
- seguridadpublica.go.cr/estructura/viceministrour/fuerza_publica/

The Public Force of Costa Rica (Spanish: Fuerza Pública de Costa Rica) is the national law enforcement agency of Costa Rica, whose duties include internal security and border control.

== History ==
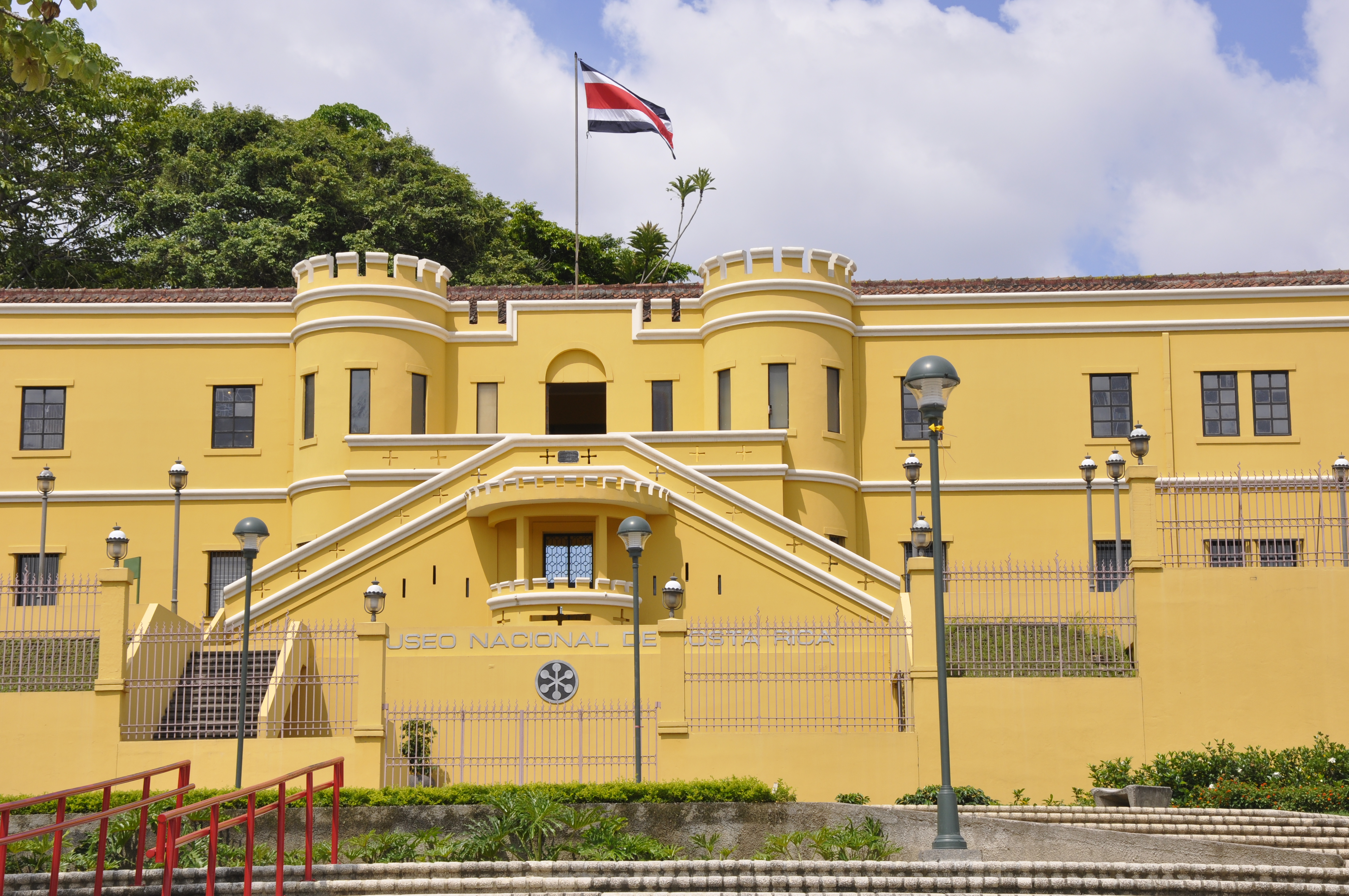
Cuartel Bellavista, today Museo Nacional de Costa Rica.

On 1 December 1948, the President of Costa Rica, José Figueres Ferrer, abolished the Costa Rican military after his victory in the Costa Rican Civil War. In a ceremony at the national capital of San José, Figueres symbolically broke a wall with a mallet, symbolizing an end to the military's existence. In 1949, the abolition of the Costa Rican military was introduced in Article 12 of the Constitution of Costa Rica. The budget previously dedicated to the military is now dedicated to security, education and culture. Costa Rica maintains Police Guard forces. The museum Museo Nacional de Costa Rica was placed in the Cuartel Bellavista as a symbol of commitment to culture. In 1986, President Oscar Arias Sánchez declared December 1 as the Día de la Abolición del Ejército (Military abolition day) with Law #8115. Unlike its neighbors, Costa Rica has not endured a civil war since 1948. Costa Rica maintains small forces capable of law enforcement, but has no permanent standing army.

=== Public Force of the Ministry of Public Security (1996) ===
In 1996, the Ministry of Public Security established the Fuerza Pública or Public Force, a gendarmerie which reorganised and eliminated the Civil Guard, Rural Assistance Guard, and Frontier Guards as separate entities. They are now under the Ministry and operate on a geographic command basis performing ground security, law enforcement, counter-narcotics, border patrol, and tourism security functions. The Costa Rica Coast Guard also operates directly under the Ministry but is not a part of the Public Force proper.

Outside the Fuerza Pública, there is a small Special Forces Unit, the Unidad Especial de Intervencion (UEI) or Special Intervention Unit, an elite commando force which trains with special forces from around the world, but is not part of the main police forces. Instead, it is part of the Intelligence and Security Directorate (DIS) which reports directly to the Minister of the Presidency. About 70 members strong, it is organized along military lines, although officially it is a civilian police unit.

The motto of the Public Force is "God, Fatherland, and Honour." Commissioner of Police Juan José Andrade Morales serves as its current Commissioner General.

== Ranks ==
- Comisario de Policía/ Director general de la Fuerza Pública
- Comisionado de Policía
- Comandante de Policía
- Capitán de Policía
- Intendente
- Sub Intendente
- Sargento de Policía
- Inspector
- Agente 2
- Agente 1

== Equipment ==
=== Small arms ===
Name	Image	Caliber	Type	Origin	Notes
Pistols
IWI Jericho 941		9×19mm	Semi-automatic pistol	Israel	
Beretta 92		9×19mm	Semi-automatic pistol	Italy	
Beretta M9		9×19mm	Semi-automatic pistol	United States Italy	
SIG Sauer P226		9×19mm	Semi-automatic pistol	Switzerland	
M1911		.45 ACP	Semi-automatic pistol	United States	
Smith & Wesson Model 10		.38 Special	Revolver	United States	
Sub-machine guns
Heckler & Koch MP5		9×19mm	Submachine gun	West Germany	
Uzi		9×19mm	Submachine gun	Israel	
MAB-38		9×19mm	Submachine gun	Kingdom of Italy	
Beretta M12		9×19mm	Submachine gun	Italy	
Rifles
M14		7.62×51mm	Battle rifle	United States	
FN FAL		7.62×51mm	Battle rifle	Belgium	
SIG SG 556		5.56×45mm	Assault rifle	Switzerland	
IMI Galil		5.56×45mm	Assault rifle	Israel	
IWI Tavor		5.56×45mm	Bullpup Assault rifle	Israel	
Steyr AUG		5.56×45mm	Bullpup Assault rifle	Austria	
T65		5.56×45mm	Assault rifle	Taiwan	
M16		5.56×45mm	Assault rifle	United States	
M4		5.56×45mm	Carbine Assault rifle	United States	
Sniper rifles
Remington M700		.308 Winchester	Sniper rifle	United States	
M24 SWS		7.62×51mm	Sniper rifle	United States	
SVD		7.62×54mmR	Designated marksman rifle Sniper rifle	Soviet Union	
Machine guns
Browning M1918		.303 British	Light machine gun	United States	
Browning M1919		7.62×51mm	Medium machine gun	United States	
M60		7.62×51mm	General-purpose machine gun	United States	
IWI Negev		7.62×51mm	Light machine gun	Israel	
Grenade launchers
M79		40×46mm	Grenade launcher	United States	

== See also ==
- List of countries without armed forces
- Special Intervention Unit (Costa Rica)
