= Cornelia Phillips Spencer =

American poet, social historian, journalist

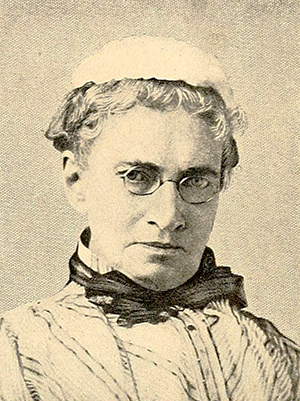
Photograph of Cornelia Phillips Spencer

Cornelia Phillips Spencer (March 20, 1825 – March 11, 1908) was a poet, social historian and journalist in North Carolina, United States, who was instrumental in reopening the University of North Carolina after a five-year shutdown during the Reconstruction era.

== Biography ==
Cornelia Ann Phillips was born on March 20, 1825, in Harlem, New York City, New York, the youngest of three children born to James Phillips and Judith Vermeule Phillips. (Her brother Samuel F. Phillips was United States solicitor general under President Ulysses S. Grant.) In 1826, James Phillips took a post as a mathematics professor at the University of North Carolina at Chapel Hill.

She married James Monroe Spencer in 1855 and moved to Alabama, where their only child, Julia (later known as June Spencer Love), was born in 1859. Spencer and her daughter returned to Chapel Hill after her husband's death in 1861, where she began her first book and wrote about the university for local newspapers. She published regular columns in The North Carolina Presbyterian and the Raleigh Sentinel.

She urged the North Carolina legislature to close the university in 1870 to protect the school from Reconstruction politics, later revealed to be her own disagreement with the politics of university leaders at the time.

After Reconstruction, she similarly urged the school's reopening and, on March 20, 1875, Spencer climbed to the roof of the South Building and rang its bell to celebrate. She contributed to the university by writing hymns for special occasions, organizing community events and keeping the alumni records. In 1895, she became the first woman to receive an honorary degree from the University.

=== Death and afterward ===
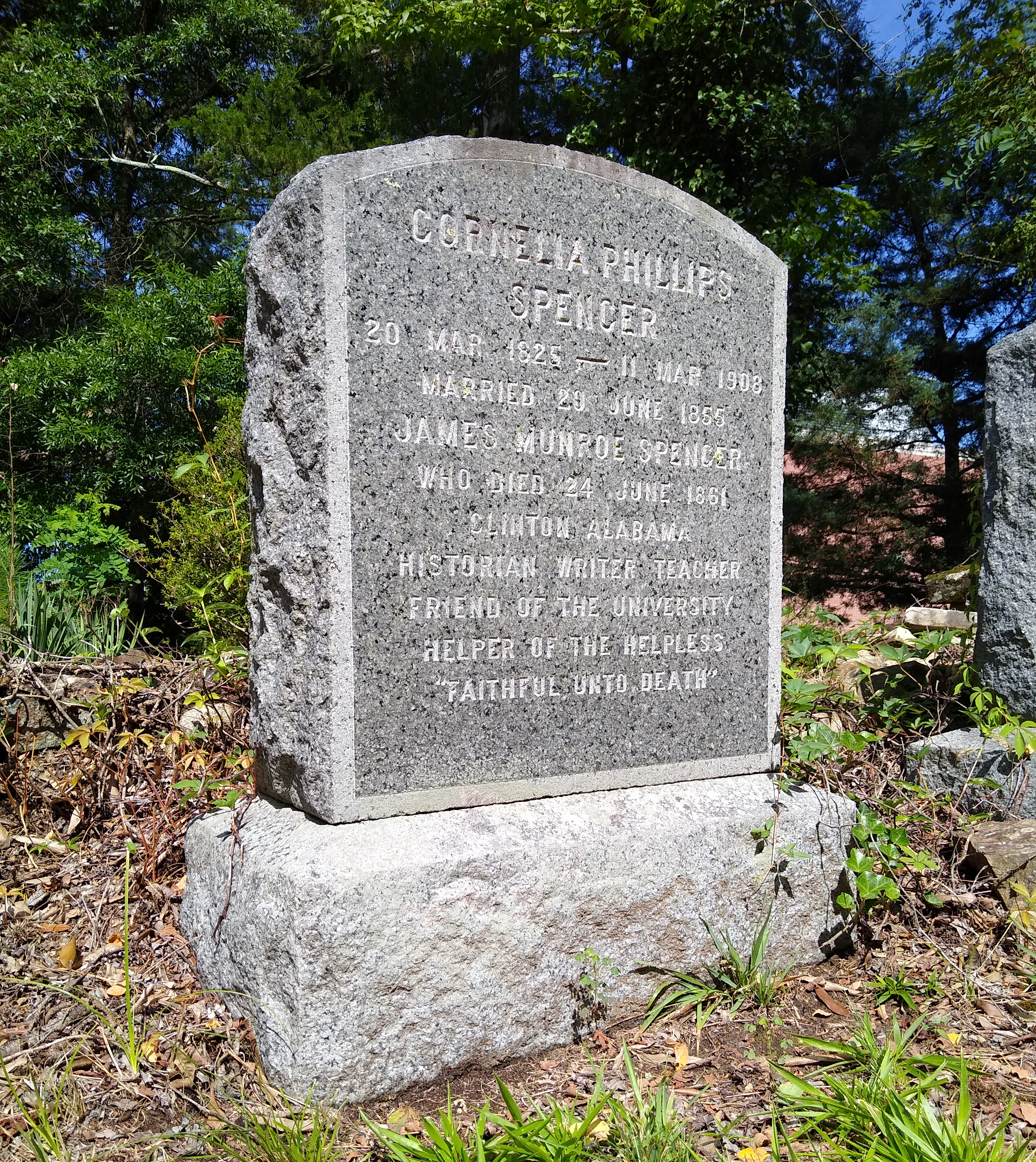
Cornelia Phillips Spencer's gravestone at the Old Chapel Hill Cemetery

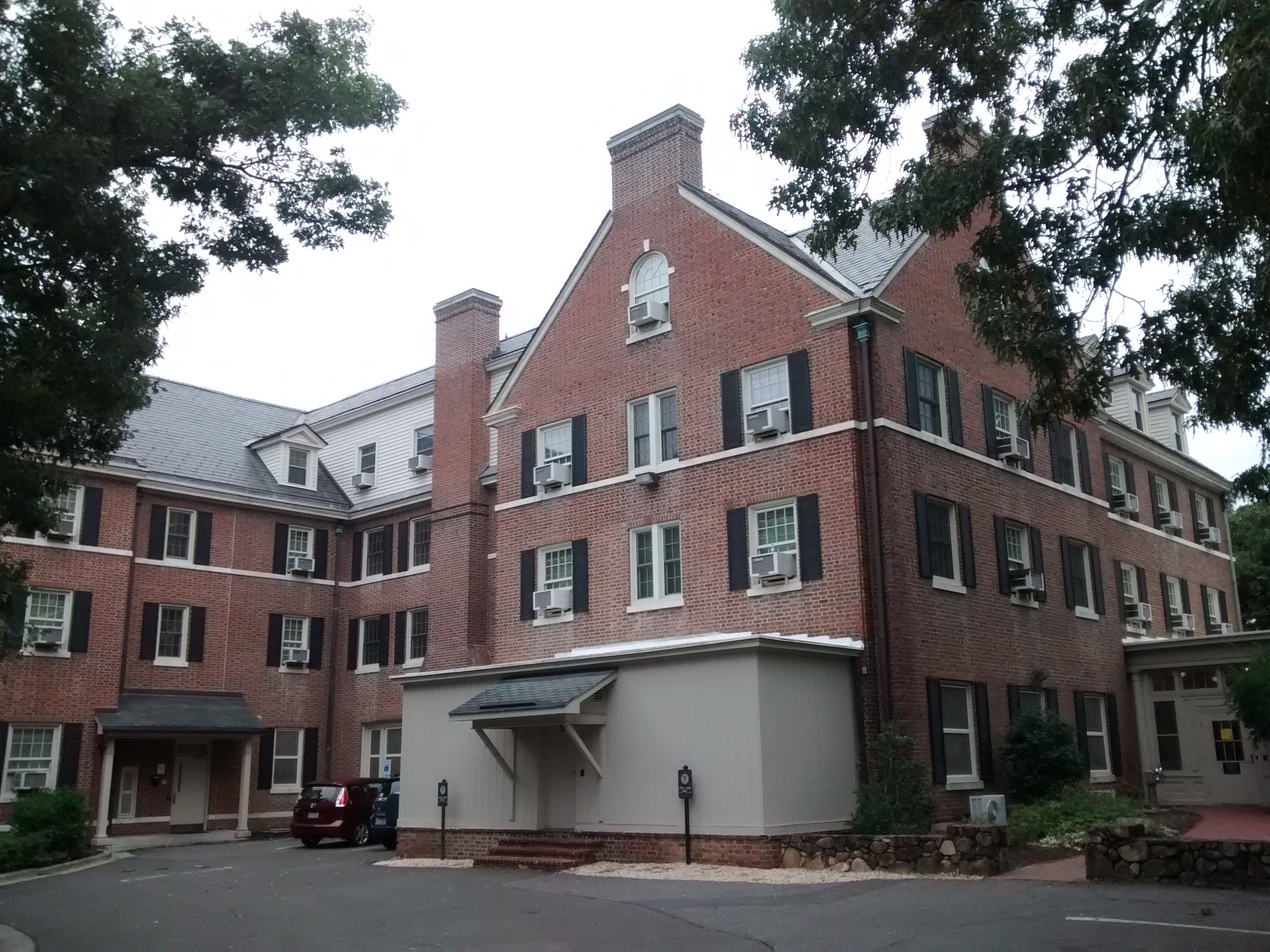
Spencer Residence Hall at UNC

Cornelia Phillips Spencer died at her home in on March 11, 1908. She was interred in Old Chapel Hill Cemetery. Her collected papers are in the Southern Historical Collection at the University of North Carolina at Chapel Hill. The university's Spencer Residence Hall is also named for her.

As part of the university's bicentennial activities, the Cornelia Phillips Spencer Bell Award was established. The award, given to a woman who has made outstanding contributions to the university, was awarded annually from 1994 until 2004, when it was retired following the discovery that Spencer espoused racist views, based on letters found in university archives, including opposing the admission of African-American students. The University Awards for the Advancement of Women were created following the Bell Awards' retirement.

== Published works ==
- The Last Ninety Days of the War in North Carolina (Watchman Publishing Company, 1866) digital edition
- Pen and ink sketches of the University of North Carolina, as it has been (c. 1869)
- A walk in October (Dialectic and Philanthropic Societies, 1882)
- First steps in North Carolina history (A. Williams & Co., 1889)

Posthumously:

- Hope Summerell Chamberlain, Old days in Chapel Hill, being the life and letters of Cornelia Phillips Spencer (University of North Carolina Press, 1926)
- Phillips Russell, The woman who rang the bell; the story of Cornelia Phillips Spencer (University of North Carolina Press, 1949)
- Selected papers (University of North Carolina Press, 1953)
