= SS Booker T. Washington =

United States Maritime Commission Liberty ship

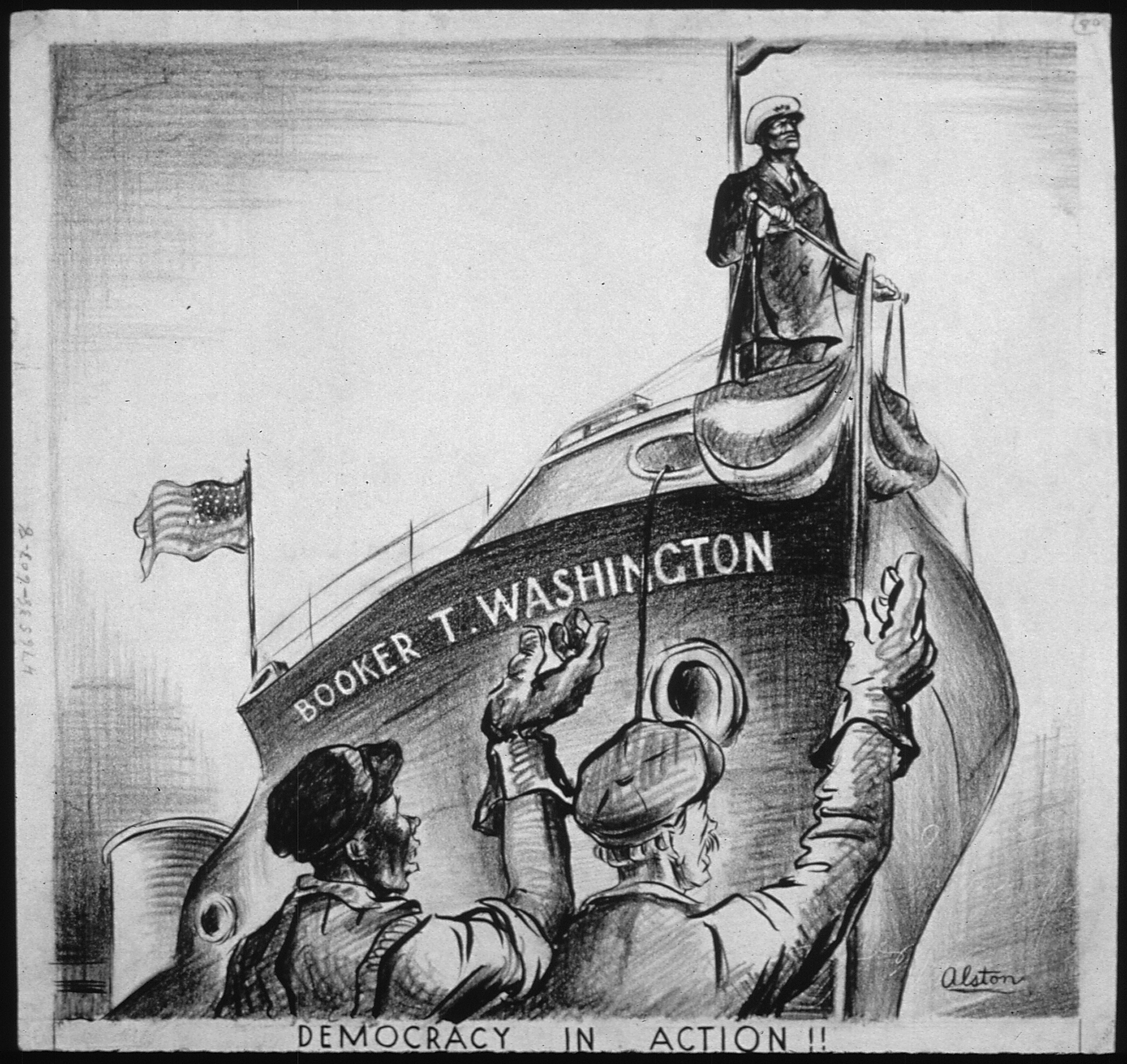
- SS Booker T. Washington by Charles Alston

History
- Name: Booker T Washington
- Namesake: Booker T. Washington
- Owner: United States Maritime Commission
- Operator: War Shipping Administration
- Builder: California Shipbuilding Corporation, Terminal Island, Los Angeles
- Yard number: 73
- Way number: 14
- Laid down: 19 August 1942
- Launched: 29 September 1942
- Christened: 29 September 1942 by Marian Anderson
- Completed: 17 October 1942
- Identification: Official number: 342392
- Fate: Scrapped, 1969

General characteristics
- Class & type: Type EC2-S-C1 Liberty ship
- Tonnage: 7,176 GRT, 10,807 DWT
- Displacement: 14,245 long tons (14,474 t)
- Length: 441 ft 6 in (134.57 m) o/a; 417 ft 9 in (127.33 m) lbp; 427 ft (130 m) w/l
- Beam: 56 ft 10 in (17.32 m)
- Draft: 27 ft 9 in (8.46 m)
- Propulsion: Two oil-fired boilers; Triple-expansion steam engine; 2,500 hp (1,900 kW); Single screw
- Speed: 11 knots (20 km/h; 13 mph)
- Range: 20,000 nmi (37,000 km; 23,000 mi)
- Capacity: 10,856 t (10,685 long tons) deadweight (DWT)
- Crew: 81
- Armament: Stern-mounted 4 in (100 mm) deck gun for use against surfaced submarines, variety of anti-aircraft guns

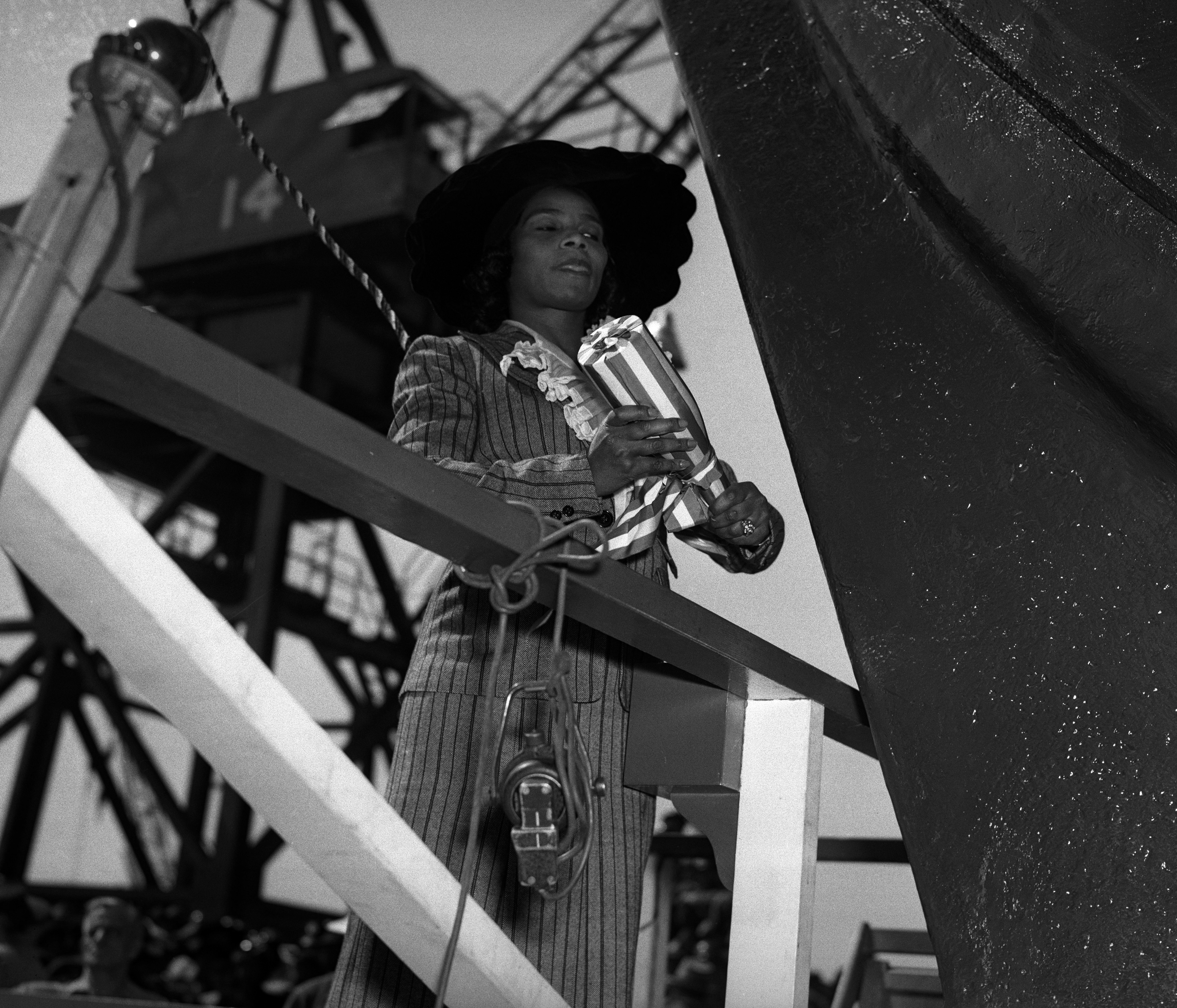
Marian Anderson, the great American opera contralto, prepares to christen the Booker T. Washington.

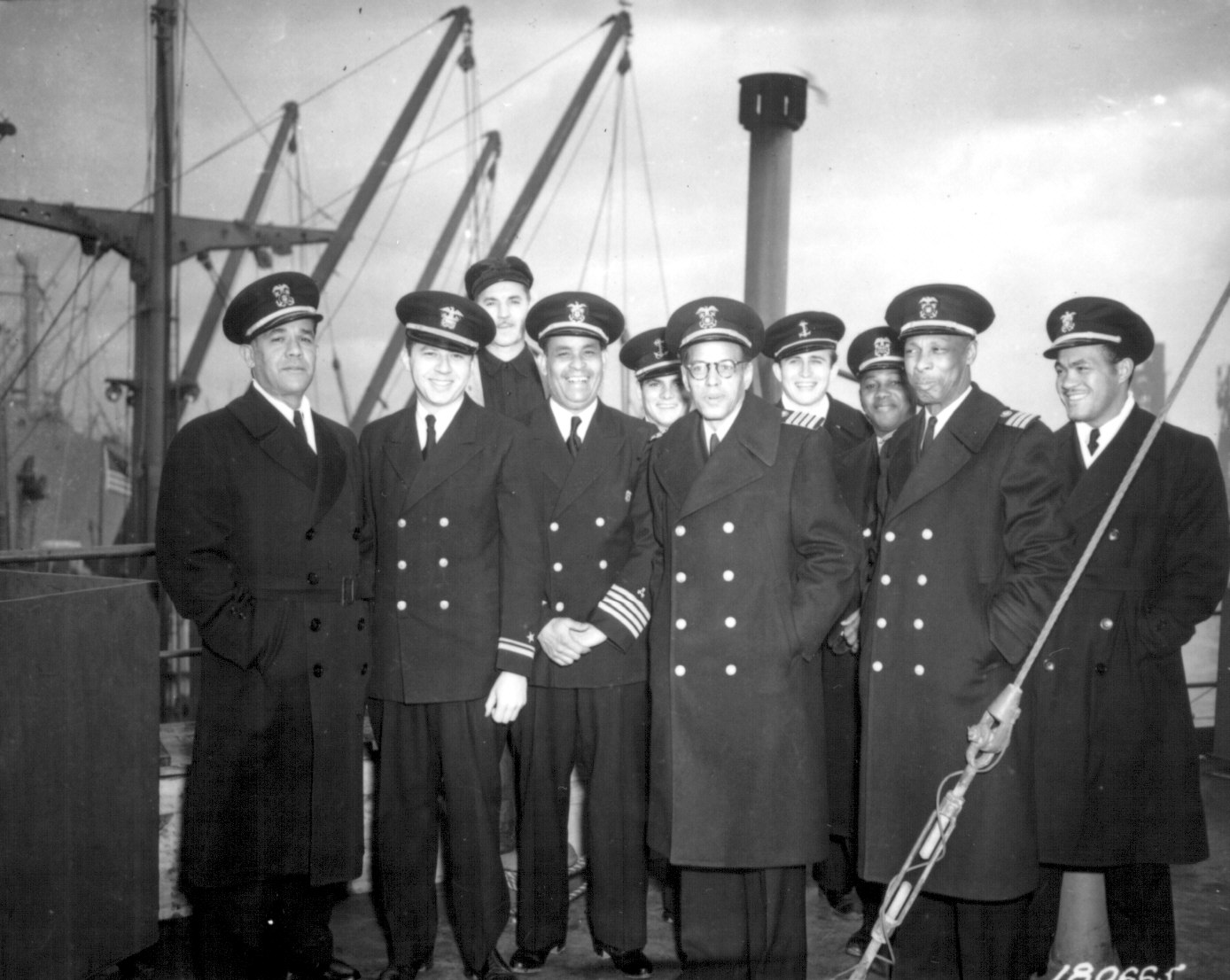
Captain and crew of the new Liberty Ship SS Booker T. Washington just after it completed its maiden voyage to England. (L-R) C. Lastic, Second Mate; T. J. Young, Midshipman; E. B. Hlubik, Midshipman; C. Blackman, Radio Operator; T. A. Smith, Chief Engineer; Hugh Mulzac, Captain of the ship; Adolphus Fokes, Chief Mate; Lt. H. Kruley; E. P. Rutland, Second Engineer; and H. E. Larson, Third Engineer." Captain Hugh Mulzac is fourth from the left on the first row. 8 February 1943.

Booker T. Washington was a United States Maritime Commission (MC) Liberty ship and the first major oceangoing ship and first of 17 Liberty ships that were named after African-Americans. The ship was named for Booker T. Washington, notable educator, author, orator, and advisor to presidents of the United States. At launch Mary McLeod Bethune gave the address and notable singer Marian Anderson christened the ship.

Hugh Mulzac, the first African-American earn a United States Merchant Marine master's license and only African American to have such license was selected to command a ship after acceptance trials. In 1942, the ship had an integrated crew of 18 nationalities. Between 1942 and 1947, it had made 22 round trip voyages ferrying troops and supplies to Europe and the Pacific theatre.

== Construction ==
Booker T. Washington, MC hull number 648, was laid down on 19 August 1942 and launched on 29 September by California Shipbuilding Corporation, Terminal Island, Los Angeles. The ship was the first large oceangoing ship named after an African American and first of seventeen Liberty ships to be so named. Mary McLeod Bethune gave the address at the launching ceremony and Marian Anderson christened the ship. As part of the Maritime Commission plan the ship was to be delivered after sea trials and acceptance to the command of the only African American in the nation to hold a master's certificate, Captain Hugh Mulzac. The ship was delivered to the War Shipping Administration (WSA) for operation on 17 October 1942 with Luckenbach Steamship Company as the WSA agent. Captain Mulzac remained in command for the next four years commanding an integrated crew composed of seventeen nationalities.

Booker T. Washington, official number 342392, was a standard Liberty of the cargo configuration, designated type EC2-S-C1. Specifications were for a five hold ship of 7,176 GRT, (Note: The Maritime Commission standard GRT. The MARAD status card at time of disposal shows 7,258 GRT which could reflect either modifications or different calculation method.) 10,807 DWT. The standard Liberty cargo type dimensions of 441 ft 6 in (134.57 m) length overall, 417 ft 9 in (127.33 m) length between perpendiculars, 427 ft (130 m) waterline length, 56 ft 10 in (17.32 m) beam, with a draft of 27 ft 9 in (8.46 m) applied. Though the nominal speed of the Liberty type was 11 knots (20 km/h; 13 mph) the Maritime Administration vessel status card has 11 stricken with an annotation of 12.5 knots (23.2 km/h; 14.4 mph). Cargo capacity, given in two measures of dry cargo volume as, was 499,573 cubic feet (14,146.3 m^{3}) bale and 562,608 cubic feet (15,931.3 m^{3}) grain.

== Crew ==
The captain, second officer, third officer, and the Chief Engineer were African American. Other officers were white. The crew was composed of African Americans, whites, and other races. On completion of the ship's maiden voyage morale was high, each man gave a pint of blood and purchase of war bonds was high. The crew and officers donated to buy a gold watch for Captain Mulzac. Captain Mulzac apparently thought those initiating the experiment of an integrated crew under an African American captain and other officers expected it would fail. Instead it was successful over twelve voyages in the North Atlantic, Caribbean and to North Africa.

== Operations ==
From delivery to WSA on 17 October 1942 the ship was operated by Luckenbach Steamship Company for WSA supporting wartime logistics. In early 1943 Booker T. Washington made its first trans-Atlantic crossing. On 23 March 1947 the arrangement was converted from the wartime operation agreement to a bareboat charter to Luckenbach until 19 November when the ship was put under agreement with A. L. Burbank & Company, Ltd, possibly in preparation for layup in the Hudson River Reserve Fleet on 22 December 1947. On 19 July 1951 the ship was again operated under a then Maritime Administration agreement until entering the Olympia Reserve Fleet 26 September 1952. From then until sold in 1969 the ship was part of the Grain Program in which surplus grain was stored in National Defense Reserve Fleet ships with ships being activated only to load or unload grain.

== Disposal ==
The ship was sold for $40,404.04 on 21 May 1969 to Zidell Explorations, Inc. and removed from the Reserve Fleet, Olympia, Washington on 24 June 1969 for scrapping.

== In popular culture ==
- The captain Hugh Mulzac and the Liberty ship he commanded were featured on Combat Ships - Hidden Figures (Season 4 Episode 3)

== See also ==
- List of things named after Booker T. Washington
- List of Liberty ships
- Maritime history of the United States
