= Saint Vincent and the Grenadines patrol vessel Captain Hugh Mulzac =

Vincentian patrol boat

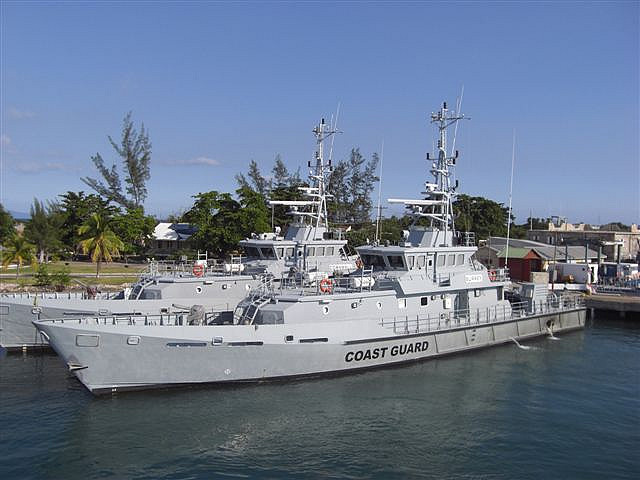
- HMJS Middlesex (rear) as a patrol vessel of the Jamaica Defence Force Coast Guard

History

Saint Vincent and the Grenadines
- Name: 2019: Captain Hugh Mulzac; 2017: Soberanía I; 2005: Middlesex
- Namesake: Hugh Mulzac
- Cost: EC$18 million
- Completed: 2006
- Acquired: 21 January 2019
- Home port: Kingstown, Saint Vincent
- Identification: IMO number: 9348390; MMSI number: 376835000; Call Sign: J8B5775; Pennant number: SVG 01
- Status: In service

General characteristics
- Class & type: County-class offshore patrol vessel
- Length: 43 m (141 ft 1 in)
- Beam: 7 m (23 ft 0 in)
- Draught: 2.5 m (8 ft 2 in)
- Speed: 26 knots (48 km/h; 30 mph)
- Range: 1,800 nmi (3,300 km; 2,100 mi)
- Endurance: 14 days
- Capacity: 4 additional berths
- Complement: 18
- Sensors & processing systems: X-band radar

Captain Hugh Mulzac is a County-class offshore patrol vessel of the Saint Vincent and the Grenadines Coast Guard. Built for the Jamaica Defence Force Coast Guard as HMJS Middlesex in 2005, the vessel was purchased in 2019 by Saint Vincent and the Grenadines. It operates in the territorial waters of the island nation, performing maritime security and search and rescue missions. It is the second ship to be named for Hugh Mulzac, a Vincentian native who was the first African-American commercial ship captain, commanding the SS Booker T. Washington in World War II.

== Description ==
Captain Hugh Mulzac is a County-class offshore patrol vessel based on the Dutch Damen Stan Patrol 4207 boat. It has a length of 43 m (141 ft 1 in), a beam of 7 m (23 ft 0 in), and a draft of 2.5 m (8 ft 2 in). It has a maximum speed of 26 knots (48 km/h; 30 mph) and is capable of remaining at sea for 14 days with a maximum range of 1,800 nautical miles (3,300 km; 2,100 mi). It has a crew of 18 and can host 4 guests, and has advanced X-band radar systems.

== History ==
The ship was built in the Netherlands by the Damen Group and sold to Jamaica in November 2005. The vessel was one of three offshore patrol vessels operated by the Jamaica Defence Force Coast Guard, along with HMJS Cornwall and HMJS Surrey. It was decommissioned from the JDF Coast Guard on 8 December 2017 and returned to the Damen Group as collateral in advance of the purchase of two new vessels of the same model. Damen modernized the returned ships, adding two 14.5 mm KPVT heavy machine guns, one on the fore and aft. The Nicaraguan Navy then purchased the vessel along with another County-class ship, commissioning it as Soberanía I.

Saint Vincent and the Grenadines purchased the vessel from Nicaragua for EC$18 million ($6.7 million) in late 2018, receiving it in December 2018 after a period of maintenance and crew training. The ship was commissioned by Prime Minister Ralph Gonsalves as Captain Hugh Mulzac in Kingstown, Saint Vincent, on 21 January 2019. On 10 April 2019, Captain Hugh Mulzac attended the burning vessel Gem Star in port at the Grenadines Wharf in Kingstown, assisting in water safety and firefighting alongside a Coast Guard RHIB and the tug Captain Bim. By the end of the day, the fire subsided and Captain Hugh Mulzac retired from the scene.

On 3 July 2025, Captain Hugh Mulzac ran aground on a coral reef while entering port on Union Island. No crew members were injured, but initial attempts to free the ship with the assistance of MV Bequia Express were unsuccessful. Captain Hugh Mulzac managed to lift off the reef under its own power during high tide the following day, and made its way to the coast guard base at Calliaqua for inspection and repair.
