= Una Mulzac =

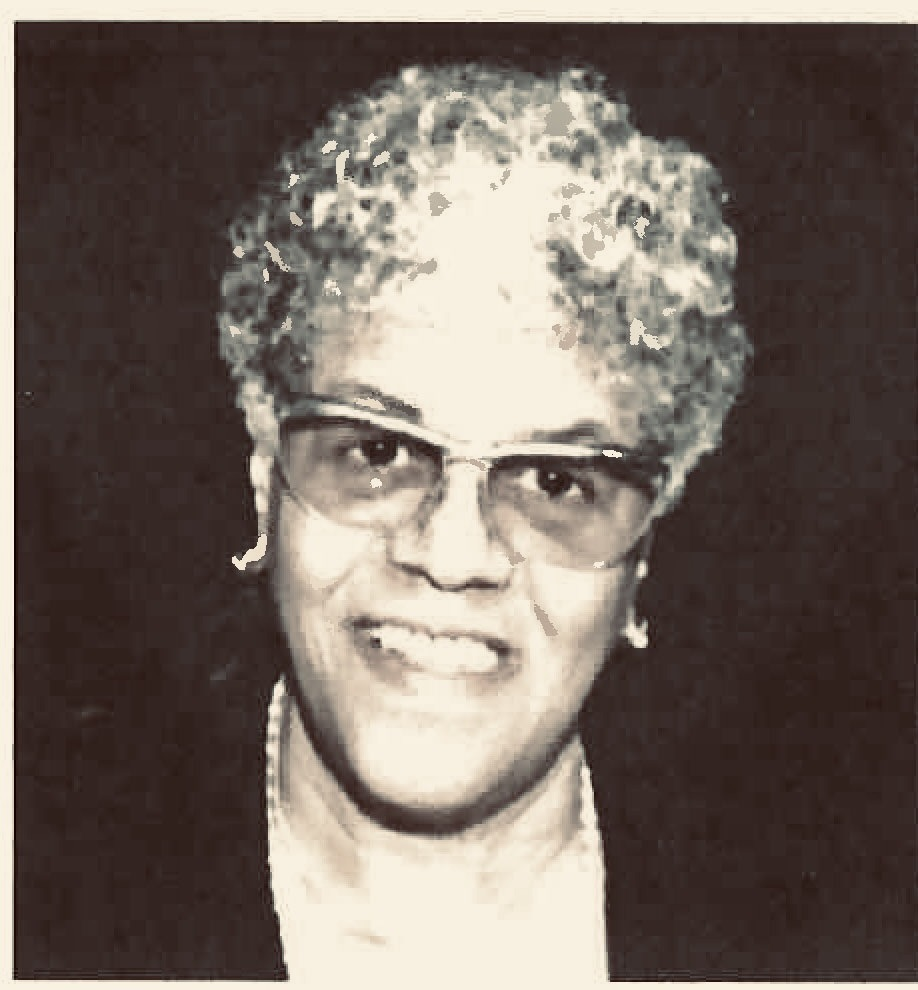
Una Godfrey Mulzac-Muckram

Una G. Mulzac (April 19, 1923 – January 21, 2012) was an African American bookseller and founder of the Liberation Bookstore, a prominent African-American bookstore specializing in political and Black Power materials and was located in Harlem.

== Personal life ==
Una Mulzac was born in Baltimore, but raised in Brooklyn, New York. Her father, Hugh Mulzac, was a socialist and the first black commander of a ship in the United States Merchant Marine. She grew up in Bedford–Stuyvesant, where she graduated from Girls' High School. Mulzac briefly worked as a secretary for Random House. In 1963, Mulzac moved to British Guiana, where she joined the People's Progressive Party and ran their bookstore in the capital of Georgetown. She was injured in a bomb attack at the Progressive Book Store. Mulzac was on the executive board of the Harlem chapter of the NAACP. Her grand nephew is Sharrif Simmons, a poet and songwriter.

== Liberation Bookstore ==
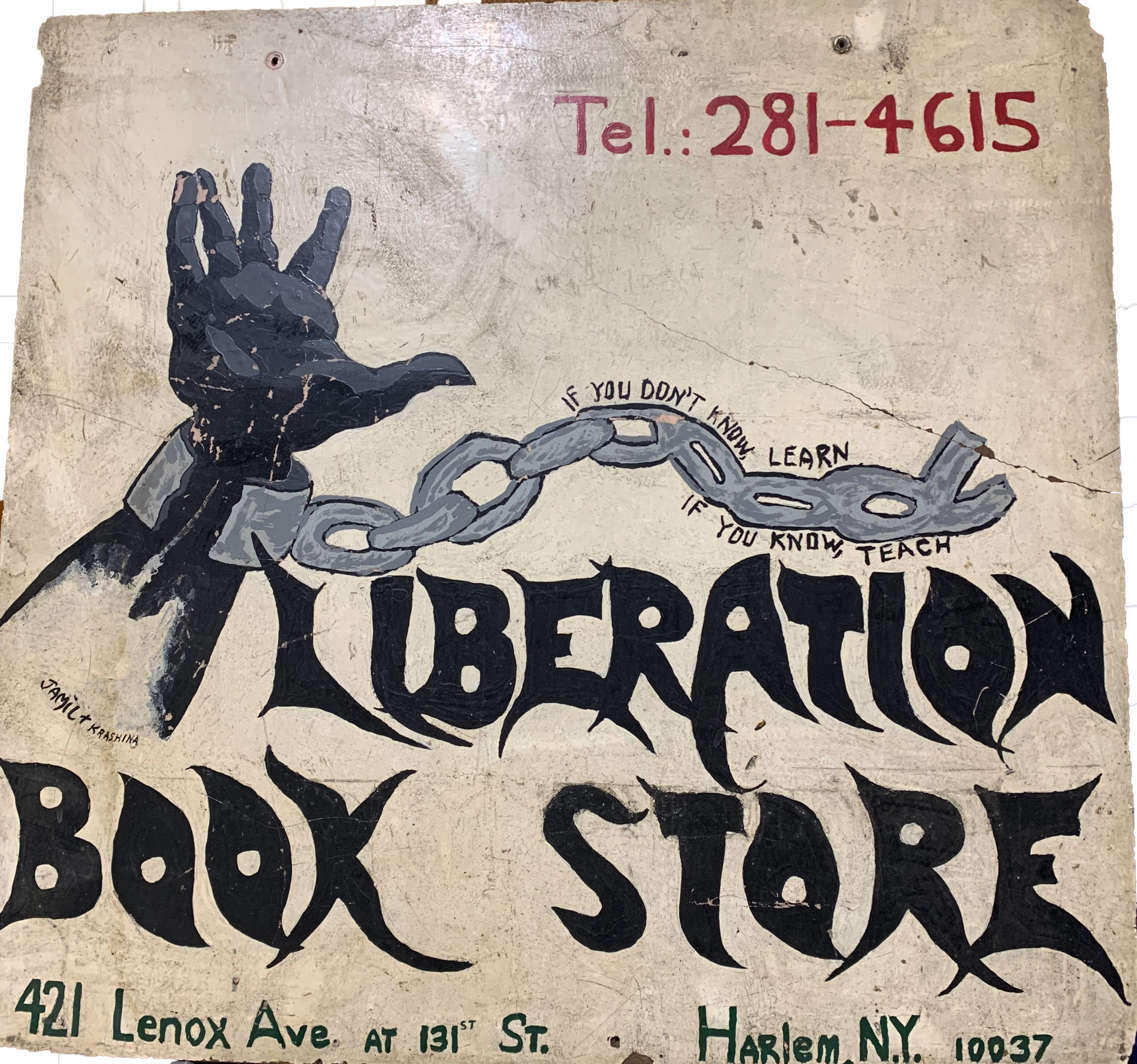

A year after to returning to Harlem from British Guiana, Mulzac opened the Liberation Bookstore in 1967. The Liberation Bookstore has been compared to Lewis Michaux's African National Memorial Bookstore.
