= Jamaica Fire Brigade =

The Jamaica Fire Brigade (JFB) is a Department of the Ministry of Local Government of Jamaica and is the fire brigade of Jamaica. It was established in Kingston in 1871.

== Organization ==
The brigade is split into an Administrative Branch and an Operations Branch.
