= Hugh Mulzac =

American politician, mariner and ship's officer (1886–1971)

Hugh Nathaniel Mulzac
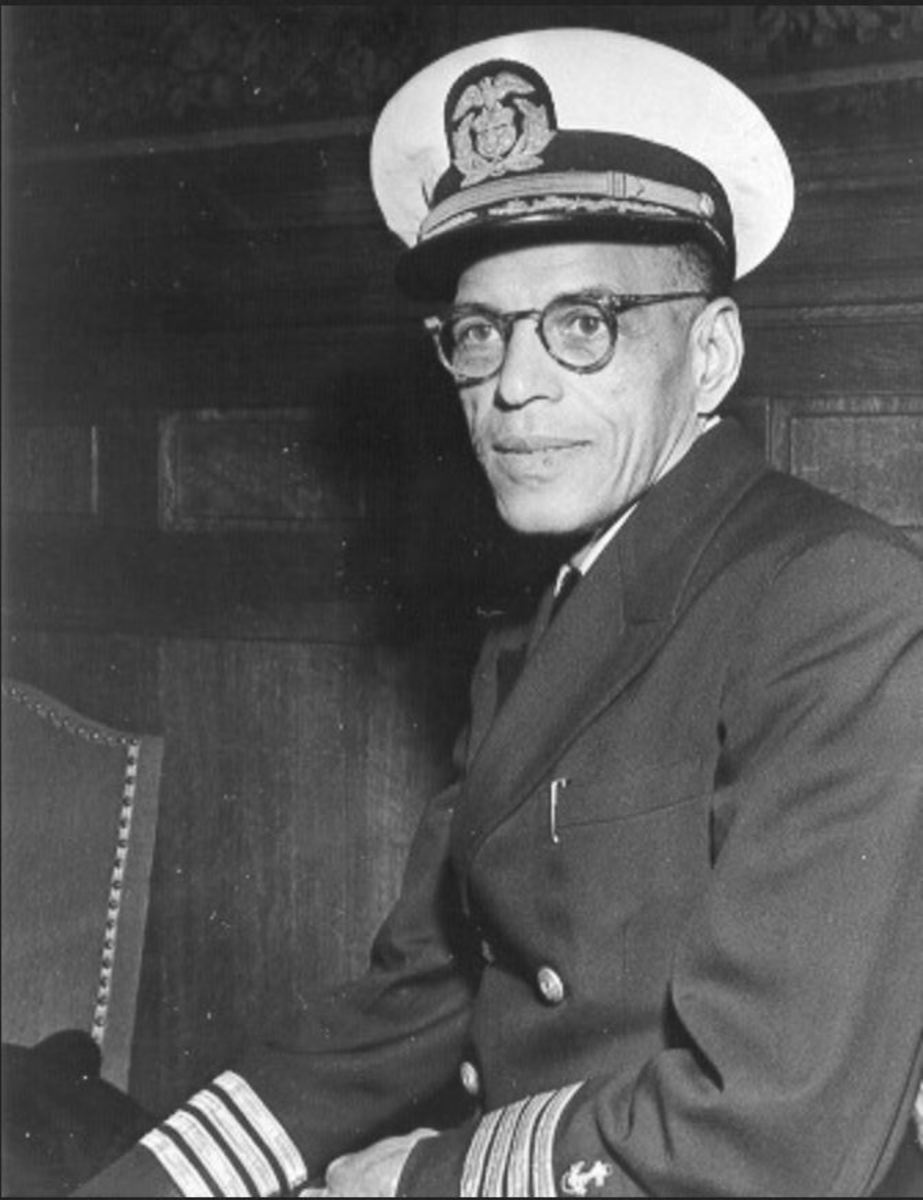
- Mulzac c. 1942
- Born: March 26, 1886; Union Island in Saint Vincent and the Grenadines
- Died: January 30, 1971 (aged 84)
- Spouse: Marie Avis

Hugh Nathaniel Mulzac (March 26, 1886 – January 30, 1971) was an African-Caribbean member of the United States Merchant Marine. He earned a Master rating in 1918, which should have qualified him to command a ship, but racial discrimination prevented this from occurring until September 29, 1942.

== Life and career ==
=== Early life ===
Hugh Nathaniel Mulzac was born March 26, 1886, on Union Island in Saint Vincent and the Grenadines (SVG). Hugh was born to Ada Roseline Donawa who was an accomplished pianist and a woman of pure African descent; Hugh's father, Richard Mulzac, was a Creole planter and a builder of whaling ships and schooners. Hugh’s grandfather Charles Malzac (sic), was a biracial man and a native of St. Kitts W.I.... The Mulzac/Malzac family were descended from a French Huguenot galley slave who escaped the sinking of the ship, ‘Notre Dame de Bonne Esperance” off the coast of Martinique in 1687. He attended the Church of England School in Kingstown, SVG which was headed by his maternal grandfather, the Rev. James Dunawa, a former student of Bishop Herbert Bree. Hugh had two older brothers Jonathon and Edward along with younger brothers Irvin, Lambi and James along with younger sisters Lavinia and Una.

=== Early career ===
Mulzac's life at sea started immediately after high school when he served on British schooners. He was sent to Swansea Nautical College in Wales to train for his ship masters license. In 1916, Hugh Mulzac emigrated to the United States. Within two years he had earned his shipping master's certificate, the first ever issued to an African American. He joined with Marcus Garvey's Universal Negro Improvement Association (UNIA) and served as first mate on the SS Yarmouth of the Black Star Line. However, disagreements with the UNIA lead to his resignation in 1921. Following the collapse of the Black Star Line in 1922, Mulzac stated that the company's executives were "staffed by opportunists and relatives from all walks of life except the shipping industry."

For the next two decades, the only shipboard work Mulzac could get was in the steward's departments on several shipping lines. Inspired by the 1934 West Coast waterfront strike, Mulzac became involved in an effort to merge the Marine Workers Industrial Union and International Seamen's Union. Mulzac supported a 1936 seamen strike by speaking to churches and fraternal organizations to build community support for the strike. Following the strike, he joined the newly formed National Maritime Union. The Union included a clause that stipulated that there should be no discrimination based on color, race, political creed, religion or national origin.

=== World War II ===
In 1942, Mulzac was offered command of the SS Booker T. Washington, the first Liberty ship to be named after an African-American. He refused at first because the crew was to be all black. He insisted on an integrated crew, stating, "Under no circumstances will I command a Jim Crow", and the authorities relented. With this, he became famous for being the first ever black captain, the first black man to obtain a ships masters license and the first black man ever to command a fully integrated vessel. Under his command, over 18,000 troops were transported around the world, and additionally "carrying vital war supplies such as tanks, aircraft and ammunition to the European front."

Mulzac campaigned for Franklin D. Roosevelt during the 1944 presidential election after an invitation from Amalgamated Clothing Workers of America president Sidney Hillman.

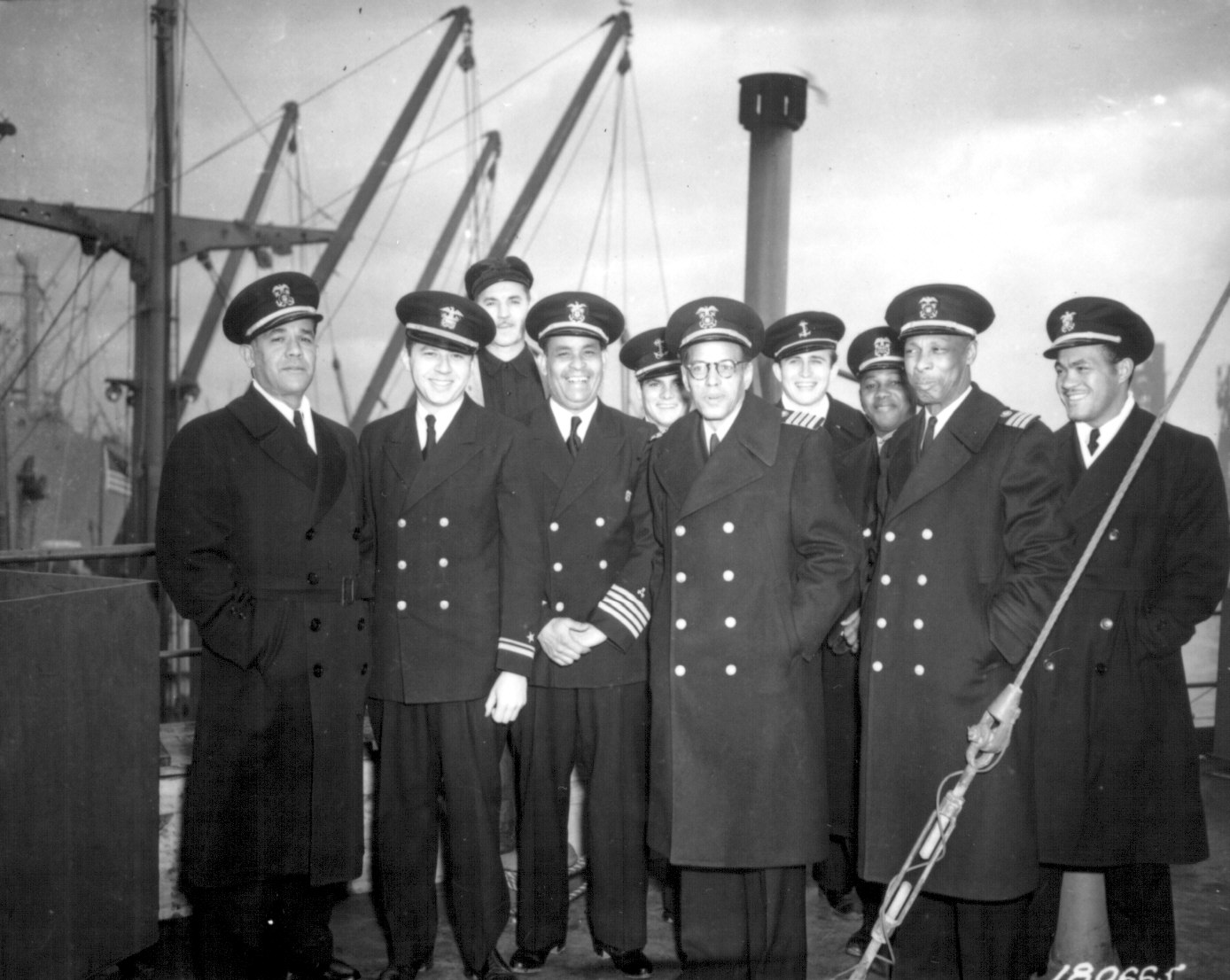
Captain Mulzac and his crew in England after the maiden voyage of the SS Booker T. Washington.

=== After the war ===
After the war, Mulzac could not regain a position as captain. In 1948 he unsuccessfully filed a lawsuit against the ship's operators. In 1951 he made a bid for Queens Borough President under the American Labor Party ticket. He lost the election, having gotten 13,300 votes.

Due to his strong ties to the labor movement, he found himself blacklisted in the era of McCarthyism. At the New York state election, 1958, he ran on the Independent-Socialist ticket for New York State Comptroller.

Mulzac was a self-taught painter, and in 1958, thirty-two of his oil paintings were put on exhibit at one man show in the Countee Cullen Library in Manhattan. In 1960 a Federal Judge restored his seaman's papers and license, and at the age of 74 he was able to find work as a night mate.

Captain Mulzac died in East Meadow, New York on January 30, 1971, at the age of 84.

== Personal life ==
On September 29, 1920, Hugh Mulzac married Miriam Aris, a native of Jamaica; they would have four children; Joyce, Una, Claire and Hugh Jr. Their daughter, Una Mulzac, was the founder of a prominent Harlem-based political and Black power-oriented bookstore, Liberation Bookstore. Hugh's nephew, John Ira Mulzac Sr., was a pilot with the Tuskegee Airmen.

== In popular culture ==
- He was mentioned in the episode "A Nugget of History" in the television series The Suite Life of Zack & Cody on the Disney Channel.
- He and the Liberty ship he commanded [SS Booker T. Washington] was featured on Combat Ships - Hidden Figures (Season 4 Episode 3)
