= Air Vigilance Service =

Air wing of Public Force of Costa Rica

Air Vigilance Service Servicio de Vigilancia Aérea
- Air Vigilance Service badge
- Abbreviation: AVS

Agency overview
- Formed: 1994

Jurisdictional structure
- National agency: Costa Rica
- Operations jurisdiction: Costa Rica
- General nature: Civilian police

Operational structure
- Headquarters: San José
- Parent agency: Public Forces of Costa Rica

Website
- www.seguridadpublica.go.cr/estructura/viceministrocpe-uc/vigilancia_aerea/

While Costa Rica does not have an official air force, it has an air wing attached to the Public Force of Costa Rica. Currently this unit, officially called Air Vigilance Service (Spanish: Servicio de Vigilancia Aérea [SVA]), also called the Air Service (Servicio Aéreo), does not operate any armed military aircraft. Its main air bases located in three different points, San José (Base 2) being the main operations center.

== Mission and functions ==
The SVA's mission is to:

Provide air support in security actions carried out by police forces, in humanitarian missions, transfers of government officials; Provide security and surveillance in the country's airports to protect domestic and foreign citizens.

Some of the most common functions of the SVA are transporting civilians in critical medical emergencies to the hospitals in the capital as well as helping in the war on drugs. Plenty of drug trafficking operations are carried in joint agreement with the U.S., mainly occurring in the coastal areas and at sea.

According to a new bill yet to be passed by the Legislative Assembly, the new designation for this police air wing would be Policia de Vigilancia Aérea (Air Vigilance Police).

== History ==
Costa Rica is one of the oldest democracies in the region and formally abolished its army on December 1, 1949, just after the end of a revolution that reformed the country's political structures. The internal security of the country was administered by the Civil Guard that, over the years, has transformed into what it is now, the Public Forces of Costa Rica, under the command of the Ministry of Public Security. It is composed of several departments: Public Force, Anti-Drug Police, National Coast Guard Service, National Police School, Reserve of the Public Force and the Air Surveillance Service, itself a successor of the Costa Rican Air Force. In 1958, the air wing was created with a Cessna 180 for the transportation of government officials and in 1962 it acquired three Cessna 185s. Later in 1970, it acquired a helicopter for use by the President. In 1994, it was renamed the Air Vigilance Service (Spanish: Servicio de Vigilancia Aérea, SVA), with 15 aircraft.

== Air Surveillance Service equipment ==
As a result of the many operations against drug trafficking, a number of aircraft have been added to the asset list by means of confiscation. The U.S. has also donated aircraft, equipment and logistic support. The prefix for most aircraft is MSP followed by a serial number.

== Aircraft ==
Former insignia

| Aircraft | Origin | Type | Variant | In service | Notes |
Transport
| Super King Air | United States | Patrol | 350 | | 1 on order |
| Harbin Y-12 | China | Transport | | 2 | |
Helicopters
| MD 500 Defender | United States | Light utility | | 1 | |
| McDonnell Douglas MD 600 | United States | Patrol | | 2 | |
| Bell UH-1 Iroquois | United States | Patrol | | 4 | |
