= Saint Vincent and the Grenadines Coast Guard =

- Flag
- Abbreviation: SVG Coast Guard

Agency overview
- Formed: 2 December 1980

Jurisdictional structure
- Operations jurisdiction: Saint Vincent and the Grenadines
- Specialist jurisdiction: Coastal patrol, marine border protection, marine search and rescue

Operational structure
- Headquarters: Kingstown, Grenadines
- Parent agency: Royal Saint Vincent and the Grenadines Police Force

Facilities
- Vessels: 5 Patrol boats; 2 Rigid hull inflatable boats

The Saint Vincent and the Grenadines Coast Guard (abbreviated as the SVG Coast Guard) is the maritime security and search and rescue element of the Royal Saint Vincent and the Grenadines Police Force. It was founded on 2 December 1980, when eight Police Force officers underwent training at the Royal Naval Engineering College in the United Kingdom.

== Operations ==
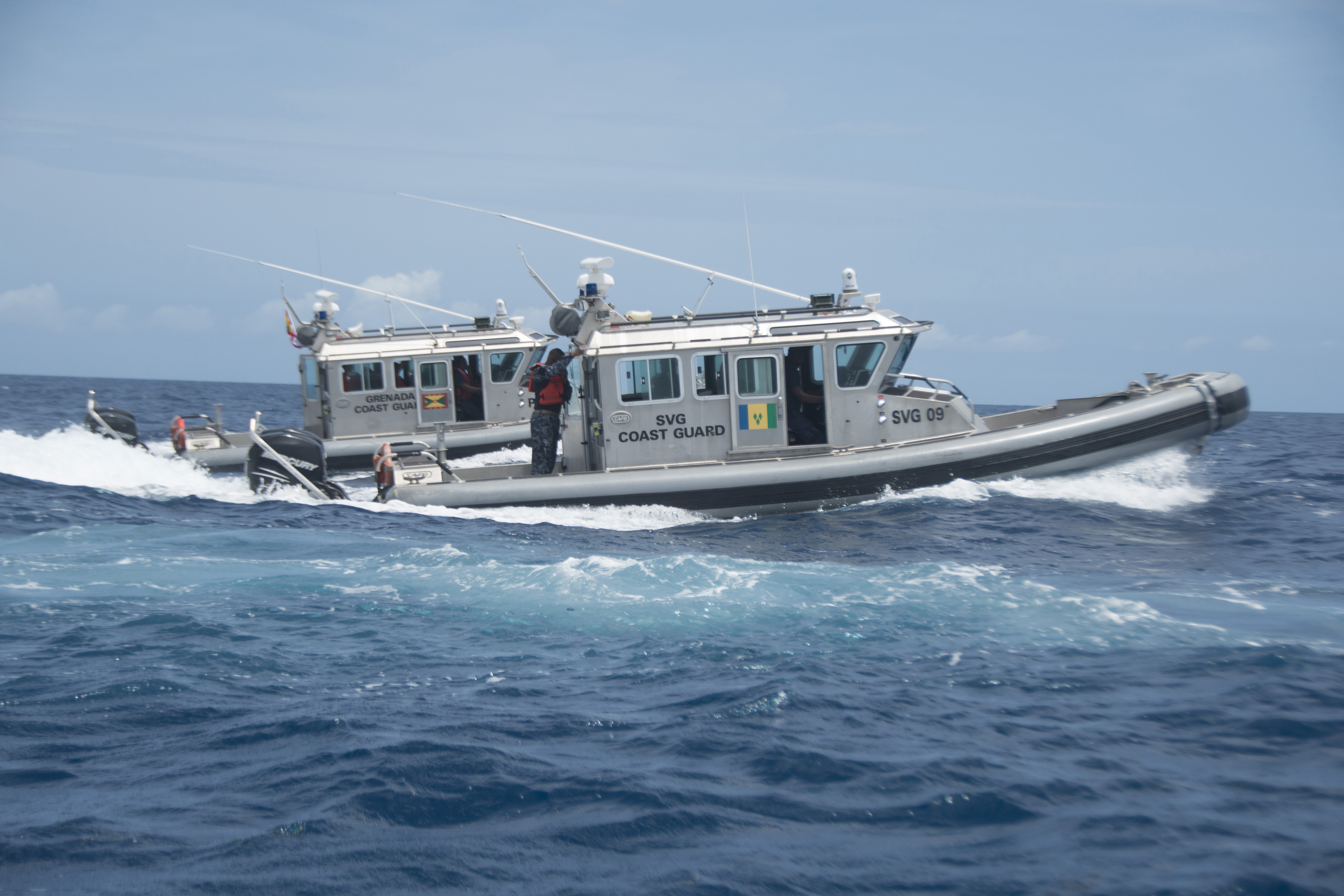
SVG 09 conducts non-compliant vessel pursuit exercises as a part of the training Operation Tradewinds 15

On 14 October 2022, a patrol boat of the SVG Coast Guard intercepted and boarded a pirogue west of the island of Canouan. The coast guard vessel detained four Trinidad and Tobago nationals who were smuggling approximately 300 grams (11 oz) of cocaine and carrying small arms ammunition.

== Organization ==
The SVG Coast Guard consists of approximately 55 servicemembers trained in Barbados, Antigua, the United States, or the United Kingdom.

On 1 April 1984, the SVG Coast Guard adopted the blue uniforms of the SVG Police Force, but differentiated its rank structure to follow a naval system similar to that of the Royal Navy. Its headquarters and main docks is in Kingstown on Saint Vincent, but it also operates several other bases on Calliaqua, Union Island, Bequia, and Canouan.

SVG Coast Guard Ranks
Officer	Rank	Commander	Lieutenant Commander	Lieutenant	Sub Lieutenant
Officer	Epaulette Insignia				
Enlisted	Rank	Chief Petty Officer	Petty Officer	Leading Seaman	Able Seaman
Enlisted	Epaulette Insignia				

== Ships ==
The George McIntosh was the first patrol boat in the SVG Coast Guard, built in and funded by the United Kingdom. It was accepted on 21 November 1981, and immediately began search and rescue operations, saving the crew of the sinking motor vessel Simone V in January 1982. The Canadian government funded two additional 27-foot (8.2 m) patrol boats in October 1982, called Larakai and Brighton, which were built domestically in Saint Vincent and the Grenadines.

The Captain Hugh Mulzac, a 120-foot (37 m) patrol boat, arrived in Saint Vincent and the Grenadines in 1987 after sailing from the United States, which funded and upkeeps the vessel. The Captain Hugh Mulzac became the new flagship of the Coast Guard, and is operates in both maritime security and search and rescue roles. In more recent years, the small boats Larakai and Brighton were decommissioned, and were replaced by several rigid hull inflatable boats and the larger patrol boat Hairoun. The need for a sea ambulance was filled in October 2019, when the Balliceaux arrived as a new ship in the fleet.

Ship Name	Image	Type	Commissioned	Origin	Status
Patrol Boats
SVG 04 Hairoun		40-foot patrol boat	2012	United States	In service
SVG 05 George McIntosh		75-foot patrol boat	21 November 1981	United Kingdom	Decommissioned in 2012
SVG 07 Larakai		27-foot patrol boat	October 1982	Saint Vincent and the Grenadines	Decommissioned
SVG 08 Brighton		27-foot patrol boat	October 1982	Saint Vincent and the Grenadines	Decommissioned
SVG 08 Chatham Bay		24-foot Boston Whaler boat			In service
SVG 09		33-foot Defender-class safe boat	25 May 2018	United States	In service
SVG Captain Mulzac		120-foot patrol boat	13 June 1987	United States	Decommissioned
SVG 01 Captain Hugh Mulzac		Damen Stan Patrol 4207 140-foot patrol boat	21 January 2019	Netherlands	In service; flagship of the Coast Guard
Rigid hull inflatable boats
SVG 02		Rigid hull inflatable boat			
SVG 03		Rigid hull inflatable boat			
Other ships
SVG 05 Balliceaux		Sea ambulance	15 October 2019	The Netherlands (Funded by United States)	In service
