= Armorial of Albania =

Coats of arms of Albanian nobility

Heraldry, as a scholarly discipline that deals with the study and origin of various symbols and elements, emerged in Albania towards the end of the 13th century. Over time, it evolved as an inseparable component of European heraldry, encompassing its advancements, shifts and accomplishments.

The earliest evidence in the usage of coats of arms can be traced to the formative period of the Principality of Arbanon, with the Gropa ruling family. This practice continued in uninterrupted succession across several medieval Albanian lineages and patronymic families, namely the Albani, Angeli, Arianiti, Balsa, Becichemo, Dukagjini, Durazzo, Dusmani, Kastrioti, Matranga, Muzaka, Scura, Thopia and numerous others.

== Medieval period ==
=== Ambiguitatem ===
Coat of arms	Description
	Coat of arms at the Abbey of Ndërfandina (????); Within the marble beam that held the gate of the monastic cell, at the old abbey of Ndërfandina in Gëziq, the Austrian consul in Shkodër, Theodor Ippen, unearthed an epigraphic inscription from the architrave of the Basilica along with a heraldic coat of arms which featured a stone-carved hawk, with one head and two wings outstretched in flight, clutching a ring on its beak. In 1967, digging through the broken fragments which had been stored at the local museum of Rrëshen, researcher Dhimitër Shuteriqi became convinced that the pieces on the inscription formed the words DIMITRI and PROGON, in reference to the princes of the Progonate family of lords that ruled over the territory now known as the Principality of Arbanon. Blazon: Upon a stone-carved escutcheon, a hawk displayed affronté, wings addorsed and elevated, plumage finely detailed. The head regardant to dexter, beaked and eyed prominent. Legs extended, talons grasping an implied perch. The tail long and fanned, descending. The whole within a bordered frame, adorned with ornamental detailing in chief. The fragments discovered in Gëziq were transferred at the Archaeological Museum of Tirana in 1981, to be further examined by conservation specialist Koço Zheku. After meticulously reconstructing the eight pieces of marble, which collectively measured 1.6 meters in length, Zheku managed to decipher the inscription as follows: O LE TÀN TH GEORGIPSEY SIT; B2̅SVIS ЄTDIMITRIC IVDICIBVS ƀHO PIC; CŌGREGATIONEHVI: BÀSILỊCЄ DÑICV PVS PÀTRON TRÀNTI SŁÀDIGNÀO; IÀT ÑEFÀMLOTvOI ⅋GONOSEVÀSTORTO; VSOÑIÀFIERI MEM̃TOð FÀMVLOTOIð; ÀbBÀTЄ His conclusive work, refuting the earlier findings by Shuteriqi, was published in the scientific periodical "Iliria", issue nr.2, p. 219–225, year 1984. At the insistence of communist officials, the inscription, unreadable in its entirety, was given a new interpretation by scholar of antiquity Injac Zamputi, reaffirming Shuteriqi's previously ambiguous claims.
	Coats of arms at Drivasto / Rozafa Fortress (????); Not far from the gates of the citadel of Drivasto, a hewn stone bearing a coat of arms was found by local peasants among the rubble and blocks of stone. Blazon (1): A stone escutcheon of circular form, measuring 49 cm by 47 cm, now fragmented, bearing faint traces of a central charge in relief, with three mullets in chief. The weathered field is encircled by concentric molded bands, partially eroded, suggesting a bordure or decorative framework. No inscription has been found to give clues as to whether the coat of arms belonged to a Venetian or an Albanian lord. One can only assume that the stone was immured in the gate and tumbled down when the wall collapsed. The coat of arms is one of the few remnants of value where once stood the medieval city of Drivasto. Excavations carried out in 1987 at the Rozafa Fortress uncovered a stone block displaying a similarly carved coat of arms, with archaeological evidence pointing to the period of the Balsa rule. Blazon (2): On a square field, a heart in chief surmounted and traversed bendwise by a narrow elongated charge; in base a crescent reversed.
	Tombstone relief at the Berat Citadel (????); First discovered by Austrian archaeologist Carl Patsch, details of the tombstone relief were published in the 1919 work titled "Archäologische Forschungen in Albanien und Montenegro" by Camillo Praschniker and Arnold Schober: Blazon: A tombstone walled in is displayed above the right apse of the small church, immediately to the left, behind the gate to the upper town. Measuring at a height of approximately 0'70" and a width of 0'45", it is crafted from grey-blue limestone, with fractures at the top. Within a recessed field, a downturned wreath surrounds an erased inscription.
	Coat of arms at the Monastery of St. Antonius (15th century); Opposite the town of Alessio, above a hill on the right bank of the Drin river, stands the small Franciscan monastery of St. Antonius. Tradition of the Franciscan order alludes to the founding of this monastery being ascribed to its founder, Francis of Assisi, going back to the 13th century. At the entrance, embedded on the pavement, a tombstone decorated with a coat of arms was found and later removed, placed alongside the interior wall. The coat of arms is surmounted by an inscription, which is, unfortunately, incomplete. It reads: SEPVLIVRA.. ANTONIO SO... CVMEREDES SVO. Sepu[lt]u[ra].. Antonio So... cum ere[d]es suo. The name of the person buried here is not clear from the inscription. The tombstone probably belongs to a Venetian lord, dating from the 15th century, since Alessio was Venetian property at the time. Blazon: An escutcheon of dimensions 850 × 152 × 150 mm, charged with a lion rampant (or possibly a panther) erect upon its hind legs. In the dexter chief, a fleur-de-lis is positioned. From each flank, a cord descends, ending in a fleur-de-lis. In contemporary Albanian history, this coat of arms is speculatively attributed to one Anton Skura, a supposed patriarch of the noble Scura family, which held sway over the territories in nearby Delbnisht, present-day Kurbin. Sources from antiquity do not provide any reliable records of an Anton Skura; although, an educator and author named Antonio Scura, from the Arbëreshë settlement of Vaccarizzo Albanese, is mentioned in the early 20th century. In 1912, he published a folk collection of lyrics titled "Gli albanesi in Italia e i loro canti tradizionali". To date, no known descendants of the Scura lineage have laid claim to such coat of arms.

=== Regnum Albaniæ ===
Coat of arms	Description
	Coat of arms of the Angevin dynasty (1292); Charles I d'Anjou, brother of King Louis IX of France, governed the Kingdom of Naples (and Sicily), during the 13th century. Following the Norman invasion, he extended his rule into Albania, capturing Dyrrhachium and bringing Albanian feudal lords under his control. The Despot of Epirus, who had nominal authority over this region, became his vassal. Charles (I) established the first Albanian kingdom, Regnum Albaniæ and was declared its King in 1272. The symbols in the Angevin coat of arms are attributed to his grandson and future heir, Philip I, Prince of Taranto. Blazon: Azure, a bend Argent running across six fleurs-de-lis Or, a label Gules.
	Coat of arms of the Manessy (1758); The Manessy family traces its noble lineage to Andrea, an Albanian captain in the service of the French monarchy, who was ennobled by royal decree on 24 November 1599. Historian Ambroise Pelletier, in his "Nobiliaire ou armorial général de la Lorraine et du Barrois", writes that Andrea was granted nobility and tax exemption in recognition of his military service against the Ottomans. The decree references an earlier document from 1580, issued by Emperor Charles V, which acknowledged the Manessy family’s noble status in Coron and Lipari. Andrea was likely the father of a christian named Manessy, resident of Nancy, who was appointed the king's judge in Goudreville, in August 1623. Over the following centuries, the family remained influential in Lorraine, with François serving as head of the cavalry and later as master-counselor of the Chamber of Finance, in 1668. His son, Charles, became the king’s judge and shortly after, a forestry officer in Chaligny. Another prominent member, Nicolas-François, carried the title Lord of Mage. As the family expanded, several branches of the Manessy settled in Meurthe-et-Moselle, Haute-Savoie, Nancy, Chambéry, Annecy, Chaumont and Saint-Maurice-de-Rumilly, where they continued to hold military and judicial offices. Claude-Joseph, Lord of Maxe, was a cavalry captain and king’s judge in Chaligny, while his nephew, Charles-Christophe, served as judge, captain and chief of police in the county of the same name. The Manessy wielded significant authority within the Church. Antoine Gabriel entered the clergy, becoming superior of the Congrégation des Sœurs, in 1740 and eventually a canon of the Toul Cathedral. During the French Revolution, he went into hiding to escape persecution, as many clergy members fell victim to revolutionary tribunals. Charles-François, a royal attorney and mayor of Nancy from 1783 to 1790, bearing the title of “Messire”, was among the last of the family to hold an official post before the political upheaval. Blazon: Azure, a palm tree proper issuant from a terrace in base, to dexter a Turk couped and recumbent and to sinister an athletic savage wreathed in foliage, holding in his dexter hand a club paleways, in chief three mullets Or, two and one; all within a cartouche ornementée.

=== Feudal lords ===
Coat of arms	Description
	Coat of arms of the Gropa (1680); The Gropa were a noble Albanian family who ruled over the eastern shore of Lake Ochrida as early as the 13th century. In recognition of the services rendered, Sevasto Paulo Gropa was granted dominion over several lands by Charles I of Anjou through a royal decree, dated 18 May 1273. Encompassing parts of the Ebu Valley, they included the villages of Radicis, Cobocheste, Zuadigorize, Sirclani and Crave Zessizane. Grand Zupan Andrea Gropa assumed control of Ochrida following the decline of the Prilep Lordship in 1371. Under his rule, the region remained an independent domain until 1380, when Karl Thopia, another prominent Albanian lord, took over governance. Zaccaria Gropa distinguished himself as a commander in several battles against the Turks and was head of the colony that migrated to Sicilia in 1465. The coat of arms of the Gropa lineage is depicted in the 1680 catalogue "La Universita delle Insegne Ligustiche Delineate da Gio Andrea Musso" (p. 13) Blazon: Azure, a griffin segreant per fess Sable and Argent, winged and membered Gules, armed and langued of the same.
Clockwise: Pilika's models (14th century and later); Petronio's model (1680); Fojnica's model (17th century)	Coats of arms of the Dukagjini (14th century); The Dukagjini were a noble Albanian family of feudal lords that ruled parts of northern Albania and western Kosovo throughout the 14th and 15th centuries. A branch of the family fled Ottoman rule and settled in the Venetian-controlled city of Capodistria, joining other Albanian nobility, the Borisi, Bruni and Bruti. Their extensive lineage is documented in Prospero Petronio's manuscript titled "Memorie istoriche sacre e profane dell'Istria e sua metropoli (1680–1681)", which traces the family's roots to Iginus Comnenus, of the Arianiti Comneni clan. Lek Dukagjini, a strong tribal chieftain, gained prominence for his work The Kanun, a set of traditional customary laws that regulated clan relations between the highlanders of northern Albania. His nephew, Giovanni, son of Demetrio, became castellan lord of San Servolo. Other members of the family gradually integrated into Ottoman suzerainty, finding their way to Istanbul where they would achieve high ranks, beginning with Dukaginzade Ahmed Pasha who served as Grand Vizier of the Ottoman Empire from 1514 to 1515 CE. His son, Dukaginzade Mehmed Pasha, went on to great feats of his own, becoming governor of Egypt from 1554 to 1556 CE. The city of Aleppo even has a Mosque complex bearing his name. Dukaginzade Yahya Bey, a warrior-poet, or sâhib-i seyf ü kalem (master of the sword and pen), took part in key battles, including Chaldiran (1514), the Ottoman-Mamluk War (1516–1517) and the Siege of Szigetvár (1566). Yahya Bey was celebrated as a prolific diwan poet during his lifetime. The earliest known artistic depiction of the Dukagjini coat of arms appears in a 14th-century manuscript, later featured in a correspondence article by scholar of antiquity Dhimtri Pilika, titled "Shqiponja Arbërore si Simbol i Dukagjinëve", published in issue no.6 (ed.VII) of the monthly socio-political and literary arts magazine YLLI. A somewhat comparable coat of arms is found in a colored miniature from the 17th century Fojnica Armorial. Blazon: The shield, presumed to be Or, displays an eagle Sable with wings spread wide, cradled by an angel. The helm, affixed to a crest, Or within, Sable without, is raised at both ends and bound by a ribbon, surmounted by a crowned eagle. Pilika's article presents an alternate coat of arms, derived from a marble carving found in the residence of Demetrio Lecca, one of the last family heirs, who served as lieutenant general in the Neapolitan Army. Arbëresh poet Girolamo de Rada (1814–1903) dedicated his 1836 work "Il Milosào" to him. The Bulletin of Central Archaeological Studies "Sylva Mala", published a similar illustration of the coat of arms in its 8th annual edition (1987). Blazon: Argent, a tower embattled of three turrets, surmounted by a crowned bicephalous eagle Sable, all within a crest coronet of the same.
	Coat of arms of the Cernovich (17th century); The Cernovich or Crnojević, were a noble family of feudal lords that ruled over the territory in what is now southern Montenegro and northern Albania, during the late 15th century. Their coat of arms is depicted in the 17th century Fojnica Armorial. Blazon: Gules, a bicephalous eagle displayed Sable, both heads crowned Or. The escutcheon ensigned with a barred helm affronté, mantled Gules doubled Argent, surmounted by a crest of a demi-wyvern Sable, langued Gules, issuant from a crown Or. Beneath, a scroll inscribed ‘ZARNOEVIC’.
	Coat of arms of the Balsa (17th century); The Balsa were a medieval dynasty of sovereigns that held ownership over the region around the east shore of Lake Scutari. In 1362, Balsa the Elder bequeathed to his sons the territory of Zeta and the coast from Budua down to Antivari, extending to Scutari, which would later become their capital. Efforts to expand south were met with opposition by the Thopia (1364), a noble family from Central Albania, who were related to the Balsa (Karl Thopia had wed Vojsava, a daughter of Balsa the Elder). Balsa II, "Sovereign of Albania", acquired Avlona and Berat by way of marriage. The Thopia eventually defeated him at the Battle of Savra in 1385. Georgio II had to relinquish his main territory, Scutari, to Venetia in 1396, unable to withstand the Ottoman incursions and the continuous internal friction. In Du Cange's work, the Balsa are described as nobles of Albania. Johann Siebmacher classifies them as Albanian under the Dulcigno list of families, in his catalog of coats of arms, (vol.4) reissued in 1873. The Balsa coat of arms is depicted in successive order, after those of the Kastrioti and Cernovich, in the 17th century Fojnica Armorial. Blazon: A mantle Gules, enfolded, accentuated with an eight-pointed star Argent; in chief, a castle Azure, masoned Sable, ensigned with a crown Or, upon which rests a canine head Sable, langued Gules. Beneath, a scroll inscribed ‘BAOXICHC’. Several theories have come about regarding the origin of the Balsa family. Authors like Malcolm and Ćirković consider them as being of Albanian stock. Bartl leans towards a probable Serbian origin. Šufflay and Skok favor a Vlach line of descent of the said family, a theory supported by Serbian historian Milena Gecić.
	Coat of arms of the Thopia (1381); Consul General Georg v. Hahn mentions in his work "Albanesische Studien" that in the monastery of St. John Vladimir, near Elbasan, an old stone was found, embedded within the church's outer wall, depicting a coat of arms, identified by an inscription as belonging to Karl Thopia. Blazon: A shield set askew in the sinister base, parted per pale; the dexter side quartered, the quarters charged respectively with a roundel bisected by two diameters conjoined at right angles, accompanied by a cross in chief and in base; the sinister side Azure, semy-de-lis, surmounted by a bend sinister. Above the shield, a tilting helm affronté, mantled on either side and adorned with fleurs-de-lis. Upon the helm, a cushion rectangular, thereon a lion sejant, langued, crowned with three ostrich feathers. In the sinister chief, three lines inscribed, with two more below, engraved in old Greek, reading as follows: ετουτα τα σηฟαδια αυΟεντου ฟεΥα ........ Καρλα Θοπηα. English translation: These are the symbols of the great Karl Thopia. Karl Thopia ruled much of Central Albania, encompassing the area between the Mat and Shkumbin rivers from 1359 to 1387. His father, Andrea, had wed the illegitimate daughter of Robert of Anjou, king of Naples. For this reason, he incorporated the Anjou symbols, featuring lilies, into his coat of arms, visible on the left side. The bendlet traversing the field is the symbol of bastardy according to heraldic tradition.
Clockwise: Official seal (1466); Du Cange's model (1680); Fojnica's model (17th century); Venetian and Neapolitan models (16th century); Schirò's model, in color (1904)	Coats of arms of the Kastrioti (1451–1904); The coat of arms of Skanderbeg with the double-headed eagle appears for the first time in a book of greetings given to Skanderbeg by Alfonso V, King of Naples, on the occasion of the signing of the Treaty of Gaeta on 26 March 1451. It was handed over by the king's protonotary, Arnaldo Fonoleda, to the ambassadors of Skanderbeg who signed this treaty, Bishop Stefan of Kruja and Father Nikola Berguci. The representative symbol of the state of Skanderbeg appears again in a Venetian catalog of coats of arms in 1463, when Gjon Kastrioti II, Skanderbeg's son, received the title "Noble of the Republic". The red and black colors in the coat of arms are mentioned in Marin Barleti's "The history of the life and deeds of Scanderbeg, Prince of Epirus" (Latin: Historia de vita et gestis Scanderbegi Epirotarvm principis), page XV, published in 1508 – «nā rubea uexilla nigris/& bicipitibus distincta aquilis (id gētis insigne erat) gerebat Scanderbegus». The usage of the same colors is later reaffirmed in Giammaria Biemmi's work "The History of Giorgio Castrioto Scander begh" (Latin: Istoria di Giorgio Castrioto detto Scander begh) who quotes the Antivarino of Bar in page 22, published in 1756 – «L'insegna di Scander begh era un' aquila negra distincta in due teste sopra campo rosso». Monthly publication "Ylli" magazine, in its 3rd annual edition, issue no.11, dated November 1962, published an article (p. 26–27) by Dhimitri Pilika [sq], a noted scholar of pelasgian antiquity, titled "Searching for "ALBANICA" through foreign archives and libraries...". The article references the official seal of Skanderbeg being discovered in Prague, Czechoslovakia, in 1961, by the widow of Stanislav Kostka Neumann, a czech writer and expert in Albanian studies. It was part of the materials belonging to slovak philologist Pavel Jozef Šafárik, who in turn had acquired them from the Ragusa Archives. Dating back to the year 1466, the seal is portrayed as such: Encircling the seal in orle, the bordure inscribed in majuscules proclaims: GEORGIVS CASTRIOTVS SCENDARBIGO. Above the eagle displayed Sable, in chief dexter and sinister, the letters D AL (Dominus Albaniae) are set in pale, denoting the noble dominion of Skanderbeg as Lord of Albania. The image of the seal graces the surface of the purple carpet inside the reception hall of the Albanian Prime Minister's office. A widely adopted variation of the coat of arms comes from an illustration found in Giuseppe Schirò's 1904 book "Gli Albanesi e la Questione Balkanica". Blazon: Gules, a shield couched, charged with a crowned bicephalous eagle displayed Sable, surmounted by a triangular pile Azure, thereon a hexagram Or.
Clockwise: Jurlaro's model; Chicago Collection model (1534); Moschi's model (20th century); Cremosano's model (1673)	Coats of arms of the Muzaka (1534–20th century); What knowledge we have of the Muzaka (Musacchi) family lineage comes from the written accounts of Gjon Muzaka, son of Gjin, great-great-grandson of sebastokrator Andrea (ruler of Molossi), whose daughter Chiranna had married Lord Gropa. First mentioned in "Breve Memoria De Li Discendenti De. Nostra Casa Musachi", republished in 1873 by Karl Hopf, the family coat of arms is described in pages 278–279: The emblem of our dynasts since ancient times has been a flowing fountain which drifts in two streams, on opposite ends. This fountain of Epirus, for which many authors have written about, douses a lit torch while sparking an unflamed one. As you know, we have cherished this fountain ever since old times for undertakings and ceremonies. Later, our family adopted the two-headed eagle, crowned with a star in the center. The emblem of your mother's – who comes from the Dukagjini line of nobility – is a white eagle. In 1336, Andrea II Muzaka gained recognition as Despot of his dominion by the Kingdom of Naples. In acknowledgment of this, King Robert of Anjou entrusted his nephew, Prince Luigi, to perform the act of recognition, which extended to the inclusion of the nobleman's coat of arms on the chancellery seal. An early artistic depiction of the Muzaka coat of arms, belonging in all probability to Teodoro, Lord of Crepacore and Galesano, can be found in bas-relief on the residence wall of Palazzo Argentina, located in San Giovanni street, Francavilla Fontana, province of Salentina. In the monograph by Rosario Jurlaro titled "I Musachi despoti d'Epiro: in Puglia a salvamento", the coat of arms can be described as follows: Blazon: Argent, a torch enflamed palewise proper atop a fountain, within a bordure embattled Azure; surmounted by a barred helm affronté with mantling. The same author speculatively accredits the symbols on the right shield of the armorial, carved from stone and found inside the Church of Santa Maria della Misericordia in Mesagne, to the Muzaka family. A disparate coat of arms attributed to Nicolao Musacchi, son of Teodoro II, appears on parchment uncovered from the equivocal Chicago Collection (AUC. 388). Dated 24 November 1534, it was commissioned by order of Charles V, Emperor of the Romans. Nicolao Musacchi, citizen of Corone [Peloponnese], the title and coat of arms «the Patriarch of our lineage, the Soldier, the Golden Horseman […and] the sons and heirs of all generations, both male and female». Blazon: Gules, a lion statant proper atop three peaks Vert, in dexter chief a sun in its splendor Or; the escutcheon surmounted by a barred helm affronté, adorned with a crest of an eagle displayed Sable. Banners and war trophies addorsed and emerging. On the architrave of the central gate at the palace of Via Regina Margherita in Niscemi is affixed the family crest of the Masaracchio. A precious sandstone sculpture from the nineteenth-century, depicting the noble Albanian symbols of the Masaracchio of Castriota family, descendants of the house of Gjin Musacchi, linked through marriage to the sister of Georgio Castriota Skandeberg, the great national hero of Albania. The shield seen here is reproduced in bronze by Florentine sculptor Mario Moschi. Blazon: An oval escutcheon quartered. 1° and 4°, a lion rampant supporting a cross; 2°, a bicephalous eagle displayed; 3°, a dexter arm embowed grasping a sword. At the fess point, an inescutcheon charged with a knight’s helm affronté. The escutcheon is ensigned by a royal crown, above which a scroll bears the inscription ‘SCANDERBEG.’ The whole is encompassed by the bordure inscription MASARACCHIO DEI CASTRIOTA. The 1673 catalogue "Galleria D'Imprese Arme Ed'Insegne De Varii Regni..." by Marco Cremosano, presents a markedly distinct coat of arms of the Musachi lineage. Blazon: Per fess Or and Gules, in chief an eagle displayed Sable, in base a bend sinister wavy Azure and Argent counter-wavy.
Clockwise: German model ms.304; 16th century model ms.1379; Year 1659 model; Venetian model (1550)	Coats of arms of the Arianiti Comneni (1550–1659); Constantino Arianiti, better known as Constantinus Cominatus, was born around 1456, the son of Georgio Arianiti, an Albanian feudal lord, ruler of Cermenica, Mochino and Spatenia, who greatly contributed in the wars against the Ottomans. Georgio formed blood ties through marriage with the Kastrioti, Dukagjini and Cernovich, although, there are no reliable accounts connecting his family to that of the Byzantine Komnenoi. He died circa 1463 and soon his possessions were taken hold by the Ottomans. Georgio's wife and sons found refuge on lands that belonged to Venetia, who in turn, recognized them as patrician dignitaries. Constantino aprenticed at the papal court in Rome, where he became an apostolic prothonotary. Later he married Francesca of Montferrat, who came from a side branch of the house of Palaiologos, which brought him several castles as dowry. Self-styled Duke of Achaea and Prince of Macedon, Constantino aspired to become leader of the Balkan Christians in the impending crusade against the Ottoman armies and even planned to assemble a fleet, which never set sail. In 1514, Pope Leo X appointed him governor of Fano, near Ancona, on the Adriatic coast. A coat of arms adopted by his lineage is displayed on a wooden ceiling panel in the castle of Casale Monferrato. Blazon: Quartered. 1° and 4°, Gules, a bicephalous eagle Or; 2° and 3°, per fess Azure and Or, in chief a pawed cross Argent and in base three bells proper. One plausible theory suggests that the double-headed eagle was incorporated into the family coat of arms through Constantino's marriage to Francesca, as the Montferrat Paleologi had used this emblem since the 14th century. As for the three bells, Tommaso Braccini writes: "Currently, it is impossible to determine where Constantino Arianiti Comneno acquired the emblem of the bells. It is hard to imagine it being derived from any branch of the byzantine Komnenos..." A differing variant of the family coat of arms appears in an early 16th century armorial, documenting the tournaments of Würzburg and Heidelberg and those of German nobility. In German heraldic tradition, the legendary figure of antiquity Alexander the Great was associated with three bells, which are depicted on his imagined coat of arms. We find the symbol of the three silver bells on a scarlet field in the mid-15th century Uffenbach Armorial. Contrarily, in the "Chronicle of Ulrich Richenthal" and the catalogue of Jörg Rugens from the late 15th century, the "kingdom of Alexander the Great" is represented by three scarlet bells on a silver field. Constantino Arianiti once famously claimed that Macedonia, Thessaly and Albania constituted his hereditary possession, territories which once belonged to Alexander the Great. Later variations of the coat of arms appear in the manuscript Ms.1379, titled "Famiglie Nobili di Venezia", housed at Biblioteca Casanatense and dating to the first half of the 16th century. In this version, the coat of arms features a golden double-headed eagle on a purpure field. In the mid-16th century compendium "Insignia Venetorum nobilium" (BSB Cod.icon. 272), the eagle is rendered black on an azure shield. And in "Libro antico dei nobeli venetti" (1659) the eagle appears brown against a green field. Blazon: Azure, a bicephalous eagle displayed Sable, within an ornate escutcheon.
	Coat of arms of the Toptani (1760); The Toptani were a wealthy land-owning family in Central Albania who ruled over the area in and around Tirana for the better part of the 19th century. Originally from Krujë, they would become one of the most powerful and influential families in all of Albania. Prominent members included Abdi and Murad, both signatories of the Declaration of Independence, the former having served as Minister of Finances in the Provisional Government and the latter being a distinguished sculptor and poet. Murad married into the Frashëri household a woman by the name of Asije, niece of Naim Frashëri. His brother, Refik, was chairman of the patriotic club "Bashkimi" and a participating delegate at the Congress of Manastir. Their father, Said (Seremedin Seid), was an intellectual in his own right, being a founding member of the Istanbul Committee, which advocated for an autonomous Albanian region within the Ottoman Empire. Essad Pasha served as Prime Minister and his brother Gani Bey was an Ottoman officer and adjutant of Sultan Abdülhamid II. Fuad served as mayor of Tirana. Sadije married Xhemal Pasha of the Zogolli clan, inherently becoming queen mother to the future King of Albania, Zog I. The family coat of arms appears in a scanned document from the 18th century and can be described as follows: Blazon: A baluster Or, issuing therefrom a bouquet of flowers proper, dexter a lion rampant guardant and sinister a horse rampant, both proper.
	Coat of arms of the Suma (1873); The Suma, or Begagni family as they were later known, are widely regarded as one of the most esteemed and powerful families in northern Albania. Their influence was rooted in longstanding intermarriage within the family bloodlines but also in newly established alliances. Prominent members of this house include patriarch Mehmed-Begh, who served as sanjak-bey of Iskodra and overseer of Zadrima on behalf of his son. He administered the Sanjak of İpek and managed the royal tax collection for all of Albania, as well as for Plava, Gjakova and Prizren. Ahmat Agha, his first cousin, became chief advisor; Omer Agha, Ahmat's brother, was lord of Barbalussi. The Suma family solidified its power through an alliance with the Balichien family, an ancient and prominent house originally known as Kanina, which gained fame during the time of Skanderbeg. They held dominion over chifliks such as Bussanti, Saccoli, Barbalussi, Buzigierbeni, Giubani, Genoçi, Trumsi, Diacondita, Pulagni, parts of Sfaccia, Marcouichi and much of Albania from the Drino River, extending into the Alps in Plava, Gjakova and Bihor. The coat of arms of the dalmatian branch of the family is depicted in the 1873 catalog titled "Wappenbuch des Königreichs Dalmatien" by Carl Georg Friedrich Heyer von Rosenfeld. Blazon: Argent, a tree eradicated proper, in base two fleurs-de-lis Azure. The helm crowned, mantled and lined, surmounted by a crest of three ostrich feathers.
	Insignia of the Gjonmarkaj (19th century); The Gjonmarkaj were, until 7 April 1939 and the advent of Communism, the rulers of Mirdita. Hailing from the Dukagjini clan, one of the oldest and most powerful families of Albanian nobility, their ancestral tree diverged into three main branches: Prenk Pasha, Lleshi i Zi and Prenk Markola. Being inherent custodians of the Kanun, they commanded respect primarily as arbiters and administrators of justice, rather than rulers in the traditional sense. Prenk Bib Doda, from the Prenk Pasha branch, served as Minister of Foreign Affairs in Turhan Përmeti's government. Unfortunately, he left no heir and with his passing, that branch of the Gjonmarkaj died out altogether. The lineage of Lleshi i Zi continued through Kapidan Marka Gjoni, the leader of Mirdita's self-government and his son Gjon Marka Gjoni. Major Prenk Gjonmarkaj, from Prenk Markola's branch, held the post of Deputy Minister of the Interior during the war. The family's heraldic achievement is depicted in the 1980 monograph titled "La casa dei Gjomarkaj", published in Palermo by Maria Greco. Blazon: Sable, a bicephalous eagle displayed radiant Or.

== Albanian nobility ==
=== Italic States ===
==== La Serenìssima ====
Coat of arms	Description
	Coat of arms of the Albani (16th century); The Albani were a noble patrician family who had settled in Trieste, before later relocating to Venetia. Closely associated with the Calbani and Turquelli families, they were known for their piety, governance and prominence as ancient Tribunes. By 1112, the family had gained entry into the Great Council and contributed to the construction of a chapel at the Monastery of San Servolo. Among several distinguished members, Giovanni Albani was one of the 41 electors of Doge Reniero Zeno, who died in 1268. Gio. Albano held office as a Justice official and due to inheritance divisions among his descendants, the Armeggi branch of the family was established. Historian Aurelio Teodoldo attributed the family's migration to Capo d’Istria, but evidence suggests that by 1457, they were already residing in the province of Veneto, at a time when Capo d’Istria was still sparsely populated. Despite this, they were recognized as devout Catholics. Another branch of the Albani family, primarily engaged in military service, relocated from the territory of Spoleto to Dalmatia during the 17th century.
	Coat of arms of Marino Becichemo (1504); Marino Becichemo (1468–1526) was an Albanian humanist, orator and chronicler. A member of a patrician family from Scutari, his father Marino the Elder had served as secretary at the Ottoman Court for the Venetian Republic and his mother Bianca Pagnano was a member of a Milanese merchant family. The young Becichemo received his humanist education in Brescia and later Padua. In 1485, he married in Dulcigno before embarking on a career as a scribe in Antivari and subsequently as a teacher in Ragusa (1494–1496). Becichemo would later serve as secretary to Melchiorre Trevisan, commander of the Venetian fleet and by 1500, was granted refuge, a status which conferred certain privileges, ultimately securing him Venetian citizenship. Working as a private tutor, he engaged in scholarly disputes with Raffaele Regio. Soon after, he relocated again to Padua, then Brescia, where he taught at the communal school (1501–1508). During his tenure in Brescia, he published two collections of speeches and philological treatises, focusing on Apuleius, Victorinus, Cicero and Pliny the Elder. His personal coat of arms, deriving from the heraldic model associated with the Trevisan family, whereby the chevron is inverted, appears on page six of the printed monograph "Marini Becichemi Scodrensis Variarum Observationum Collectanea", published in 1504 by Angelo de' Britannici. Blazon: Or, a chevron Azure; in dexter flank the letter M and in sinister B, both of the field, the escutcheon of Italian Renaissance form.
	Coat of arms of the Boni (1735); The Boni family (or Bon), noble lords of Albania, faced near exile and turned to maritime pursuits, ultimately settling in Venetia, where they prospered in the spice trade. A branch of this family emerged from Candia, distinct from the Bologna lineage, which was renowned for its contributions to the arts. Over time, they established themselves in Venetia and by 1291, members of the Boni family had secured positions in the influential Council of Ten. Others rose to prominence under the Great Chancellor, with their ranks divided into two factions, one belonging to the elite and the other known as the “red” faction. The last known arrivals of the Candia lineage were descended from the Lord of Novello. As noble Venetians, they leveraged their divided branches and Candian ties to amass wealth and establish themselves as prominent financiers. Among them, Maria Boni was a particularly notable figure. The family’s coat of arms, found in the mantle of the promenade, was linked to a smaller branch known as Cà Bon. Historical records indicate that this branch resided in Brini and to this day, some families bearing the Cà Bon name still remain. Several prominent members of the Boni family distinguished themselves in the judiciary. Simon, Marco and Adamo all served as judges, closely associated with the judicial order, much like their counterparts in the Baseggio family. In 1604, Sebastian was appointed a delegate for Asian affairs, a position also held by members of other branches of the family. Blazon: Party per fess dancetty Or and Azure.
	Coat of arms of the Bordolo (1741); The Bordolo were a prominent patrician family, active in Venetia during the 14th century. Their surname appears to derive from various places named Bordona, Bordella or Bordelasio, from which, according to manuscripts and heraldic records, the Bordolo family took its name. One chronicle suggests that the family’s origins lie elsewhere, where it is said that they came from Budua, in Albania and produced many distinguished men. In 1309, members of the Bordolo family, together with the Cerveti, founded the Church of San Giovanni della Giudecca, a work completed in 1316. Giovanni Bordolo served as Baiulus (Governor) of the Armamento, an important naval office of the Republic. He is thought to have died in 1321, though some sources give 1328, 1376 or 1386 as the year of his death. The family’s coat of arms is described as a red and green shield charged with a gold cross, symbolizing faith and service. Blazon: Quartered. 1° and 4° Gules; 2° and 3° Vert; over all a cross Or.
	Coat of arms of the Cocco (16th century); The Cocco, or Cocgini, were a noble Albanian family from Durazzo who settled in Venetia during the early years of the city's foundation. Recognized among the Patrician order in 1297, they became part of Venetian nobility, following the constitutional reform known as Serrata del Maggior Consiglio. Members of this family held important ecclesiastical positions in the Stato da Màr. In 1565, Gaetano Cocco founded the Cocco College in Padua. After the fall of La Serenìssima, their nobility received recognition from the imperial Habsburg government through Sovereign Resolutions on 11 November 1817. Their coat of arms is featured in a Florentine manuscript from the first half of the 17th century. The finely drawn illustration is followed by a detailed history of family events. French chronicler Casimiro Freschot in his work "The Values of Venetian Nobility" sheds light on this family: Durazzo in Albania, famed for Cicero's exile, who met with officious support there, is known as the ancestral birthplace of this House. Migrating to the Island shortly after its foundation, while enjoying the Tribunate, they consistently held a respected position among the nobles. The family remained within the Patriciate in 1297, with Antonio Cocco commanding galleys in the Lepanto army under the Principality of Pietro Ziani; as Francesco, held supreme command of the fleet. The family coat of arms can be described as follows: Blazon: Per fess Or and Azure, in base three bendlets Argent.
	Coat of arms of the Duodo (16th century); The Duodo were one of the most ancient families in Venetia, with records dating back to 1043 when a Fantino Duodo served as Galley Captain in the fleet of Domenico Contarini during the conquest of Zara. The family's origins remain a subject of historical debate, with some sources tracing them to Morea, near the Gulf of Lodrino. They secured a distinguished place among the Venetian nobles, gaining a seat at the Council of Ten and producing a long lineage of prominent figures. Among them was Nicolò Duodo, a senator and ambassador to various princes, active before 1350. Luca Duodo commanded the Venetian fleet with supreme authority in 1354, during the wars that defined La Serenissima's maritime dominance. Christoforo, after serving as a general on the Po River, was later rewarded with the high office of Porpora Procuratoria. As General of the Great Galleys at Curzolari, Francesco displayed extraordinary valor by disrupting enemy formations, breaking through their ranks and securing what became one of the most decisive victories for Christendom over its adversaries. In recognition of his achievements, his brother Domenico was honored as a senator, known for his unwavering integrity and wisdom. Pietro Duodo, a knight and ambassador, who in 1495 had led a squadron of Albanian cavalrymen at the Battle of Taro, transformed his mountainous estate in Monselice into a place of worship, constructing seven finely adorned churches, one of which stood out in both grandeur and sanctity, enriched with relics of Holy Bodies and other sacred remains. In later generations, Girolamo Duodo represented Veneto as an ambassador at the Court of Spain, where his prudence and diplomatic skill strengthened the Republic's influence abroad. The Duodo family resided at Santa Maria Zobenigo. According to Gallicciolli, the palace suffered severe damage in the great fire of 3 December 1741. Eventually, ownership passed on to the Barbarigo family. By 1808, the last family heir, Carlo, resided at Palazzo Duodo. Blazon: Per saltire Gules and Vert, a bend Or charged with three fleurs-de-lis Argent, accompanied in chief by a patriarchal cross Or.
	Coat of arms of the Jalina (16th century); The Jalina, or Iallnia, were an ancient Albanian family in Venetia which belonged to the local patriciate, becoming extinct with Georgio in the year 1326. Blazon: Per fess Argent and Gules, six weights counterchanged, arranged three and three.
	Coat of arms of the Minotto (16th century); Crollalanza traces the origins of the Minotto family to Albania, noting that it was among the noble families involved in the governance of Venetia at its foundation. Graf Demetrius Minotto, in his 1901 biography of the Minotto, published in German, contends that his lineage descended from Drivasto. The family was officially recognized as part of the Venetian patriciate with the cessation of the Maggior Consiglio in 1297, as cited by De Totto. Over the centuries, its members distinguished themselves as military leaders, administrators and statesmen. Notable figures include Tommaso, who in 1265 commanded the Gulf fleet against the Genoese; Marco, who in 1300 led a fleet of 37 galleys against the Greeks, captured the island of Stalimene and returned to Venetia with spoils and prisoners; and Pasqualino, who in 1364 was sent to Candia to reclaim the island from rebellious noble colonists. Another Tommaso served as one of the supercomites in 1369, joining Doge Andrea Contarini in the campaign to retake Chioggia. In 1448, Girolamo Minotto was captain of Vicenza and by 1453, was serving as bailiff in Constantinople. When the city fell to the Ottomans, he and his son were captured and brutally executed. In modern times, Giovan Pietro Minotto, president of the Royal Venetian Institute in 1866, authored the "Technological Dictionary" and invented a telegraphic device that was widely adopted in Italy and abroad. A limestone plaque, mounted on the last corner pillar to the right, on the ground floor of the Loggia, is attributed to Podestà and Captain Castellano Minotto (1463–1464). Below the shield, the inscription bears the date MCCCCLXIIII, marking the completion of the building's construction and the end of Minotto's regency. Blazon: Or, three bendlets Gules, within an ornate escutcheon.
	Coat of arms of the Spatafora (16th century); The Spatafora family, of noble lineage, traces its origin to the East – some say from Antioch, others from Greece or Albania. They arrived in the Italic States during the Crusades, possibly accompanying the Normans or perhaps Charles I of Anjou. Initially settling in Rome, they later moved to Calabria and finally Venetia, where they were accepted into the Venetian patriciate. The earliest known ancestor, Ranucio, served as ambassador for the King of Sicilia to the Pope, in 1275. His descendants became Counts of Roseto and many were interred at the church of San Giovanni Evangelista in Venetia. The Spatafora produced numerous distinguished knights, military leaders and public servants. They maintained residences in Neapolis and Sicilia, forging alliances through marriage with the Caracciolo family. In 1598, Giuseppe Spatafora was appointed Bishop of Cefalù. Sansovino, in his work "Gl'Annali ouero le Vite de' principi et signori della casa Othomana..." published in 1571, writes:...the Albanians, after breaking away from Epidamnus, established lordships in Thessaly and Macedonia, living as nomadic shepherds. In Acarnania, they pledged service to the local prince in exchange for grazing rights, but soon plotted to overthrow the Greek lords. Led by the bold Chiero Spatafora, they ambushed and captured Duke Musacchio, then pillaged the countryside and seized Arta (Ambracia). In response, Neapolitan princes landed at Corfu and marched into Acarnania to expel the Albanians. However, under Spatafora’s command and aided by Prialupo, the Bulgarian prince of Aetolia, the Albanians defeated the invaders and secured control of the region... Their family coat of arms is depicted in the 16th century catalogue titled "Insignia ... IX. Insignia Veneta, Mantuana, Bononiensia, Anconitana, Urbinatia, Perugiensia - BSB Cod.icon. 274 (p.77)" Blazon: Gules, a dexter arm embowed, vested Or, issuing from the sinister side and holding an upright sword proper Argent.
	Coat of arms of the Mengano (1735); The Mengano were an ancient family from Albania that produced prominent Tribunes. They later settled in the colonies of Candia where their lineage met its end with Georgio, son of Francesco. During the War of Candia, Bernardino Mengano was entrusted with defending the coast of Canea from the advancing Ottoman fleet. The family coat of arms is published in the 1735 catalogue titled "Nobiltà veneta con le arme et insegne di cadauna famiglia (vol. 4)". Blazon: Per pale Sable and Argent, a bicephalous eagle counterchanged, crowned Or.
	Coat of arms of the Miegano (17th century); The Miegano were a noble family from Albania, known for their integrity and exemplary conduct. In 1297, they were elected to the Great Council during the tenure of Doge Pietro Gradenigo. Members of this family were later sent to Candia along with a cavalry, where they remained. Blazon: Quartered: 1° and 4°, barry of twelve Azure and Argent; 2° and 3°, Or, a letter ‘B’ Sable. The escutcheon is adorned with mantling Gules, Vert and Argent.
	Coat of arms of the Mugaro (17th century); The Mugaro or Muzaro were a patrician family in Venetia, originating from Albania, long since extinct. Several members of this family eventually migrated to Candia. Blazon: Party per fess Vert and Argent, a bend Azure.
	Coat of arms of the Zaguri (1673); The Zaguri family were of noble Albanian lineage, having settled in Venetia during the 15th century. They played a pivotal role in facilitating the voluntary submission of Cattaro to Venetian rule in 1420. In recognition of their service, they were ennobled by La Serenissima in 1646. Trifone Zaguri, who died in Constantinople at the residence of Bailo Soranzo, had been sent to Ragusa by the Council of Ten. He penetrated the enemy’s frontlines, ransomed the slaves with his own means and fought bravely by destroying the armed ships of Castelnuovo, thus preserving the city of Cattaro, which had in other times been subjugated without resistance. From this noble lineage came Pietro IV, who played a significant role in Veneto’s naval campaigns against the Ottomans. Serving as Provveditore Ordinario in Preveza and later as Governor of the Fleet, he contributed to the conquests of Patrasso and Lepanto. Beyond his military achievements, he distinguished himself among other eminent figures, blending administrative acumen with a deep engagement in science, literature and the arts, embodying the Renaissance ideal of a scholarly statesman. Other prominent members of this family included Girolamo, who was of sharp intellect; Pietro I, a celebrated man of letters; and Marco, bishop of Vicenza and Ceneda, praised for his vast erudition and eloquence but no less, for his charity towards the poor. Pietro Antonio (1733–1806) was a senator, poet and architect, known for his longstanding friendship with Giacomo Casanova and for commissioning the reconstruction of the Church of San Maurizio, where he is interred. The family’s legacy is reflected in architectural landmarks such as Palazzo Zaguri, located in the San Marco district of Venetia. Originally built between the 14th and 15th centuries by the Pasqualini family, it later became associated with the Zaguri name. The palace has since been restored, now serving as a cultural center, converted into an exhibition space with temporary art shows. Blazon: Azure, a Moor’s head couped proper, vested Or, collared Argent.

===== Stratioti =====
Coat of arms	Description
	Coat of arms of the Capuzzimadi; The Capuzzimadi (Albanian: këpucëmadhi, meaning big-shoed) were an Albanian noble and military family, possibly originating from the Venetian stronghold of Nauplia, which had a substantial population of Arvanite settlers and cavalrymen. During the 16th and early 17th centuries, members of the family served as stratioti commanders in the imperial and Spanish armies. The family settled in Apulia, where it acquired the hereditary barony of San Marzano di San Giuseppe. Among its prominent members was Demetrio I (d. 1557), a cavalry commander who served Emperor Charles V for approximately forty years. In 1530, he purchased the fief of San Marzano for 700 ducats and received the title of baron. His military service earned him several imperial privileges. He died at Civitella del Tronto, possibly during the siege of 1557. His son and successor, Cesare (d. 1595), commanded Albanian light cavalry in Flanders, Piedmont and Savoy. He later served as lay vicar to the Greek bishop of Grevena but on 19 February 1595 was sentenced to death by the Venetian Council of Ten. Cesare's son, Demetrio II (active 1573–1620), succeeded him as baron and commanded a cavalry in Flanders and northern France. In recognition of his family's military service, the Spanish Crown granted him a monthly salary of 25 escudos in 1608. Georgio I (d. 1537) was a stratioti captain in the service of Charles V. After being captured by French forces in Piedmont, he entered their service but was subsequently recaptured and executed by imperial troops. Another family member, Georgio II (died before 1579), was a captain in Spanish service whose son, Annibale (active 1571–1579), served in the military company of the Duke of Urbino and later petitioned the Crown for payment of his father's outstanding wages. Antonio Comino (active 1592), a nephew of Cesare, served as a cavalry captain in Flanders and Milan under Philip II of Spain. Alessio (active 1602), an ensign who had served for fifteen years in Flanders and elsewhere, lost his eyesight after sustaining two arquebus wounds. Following his discharge, he petitioned the Spanish Crown for financial assistance. Blazon: Per fess, in chief Azure, an eagle displayed Argent, crowned Or, beaked and langued Gules; in base Gules, a lion rampant Or, holding a sword Argent, between two roses Argent seeded Or.
	Coat of arms of the Mates (1673); The Mates, or Matese, first appeared in historical records in 1304 when they submitted to the Kingdom of Naples. Giuseppe Valentini suggests they likely came from the region of Matja (modern-day Mat municipality). Sathas identifies the Mates (Máteons) among the stratioti who served the Republic of Veneto, stating that the family came from Modon, in the Peloponnese, before eventually settling in Cephalonia. Lazzaro (1500–1519), a stratioti captain, lost his lands after the Ottoman conquest. He was imprisoned in Venetia but later released and went on to serve Ferdinand the Catholic and Charles V, receiving land grants and privileges to settle other Albanians in Basilicata and Apulia. Zuanne (1519), son of Lazzaro, was appointed stratioti captain alongside his brother Angelo and commanded both companies but struggled with delayed payments. His children later sought restitution of estates he had sold. Andrea (1522) was appointed by Charles V as captain of 50 stratioti, receiving an annual wartime salary of 50 ducats. Bernardino (1539), son of Cola, settled in Molise after the Viceroy of Naples ordered Albanians to move to fortified towns. He maintained tax-exempt status and requested its continuation in 1563. One Demetrio Matese is mentioned as an Albanian cavalry soldier who fought at the Battle of Marciano under the command of Luigi Dovara. Pietro (1556–1605) served in the cavalry alongside Cesare Capuzzimadi and Nicola Renesi, rising to lieutenant, in Italy, Flanders and Lorraine, later fighting at the Battle of Lepanto. Nicola (1560), grandson of Lazzaro, held the rank of captain. Angelo (1566–1613) commanded a stratioti cavalry unit but faced financial struggles, repeatedly petitioning Philip II for unpaid wages and government positions. He resigned in favor of his nephew in 1600; his company passed on to Roberto Papada in 1613. Martino (1594–1598), brother of Lupo, was listed in 1594 among the royal beneficiaries in Flanders. Lupo (1605–1606) served 20 years, including 14 in Flanders under Captain Georgio Crescia and six as an ensign under Michele Bua. He fought for the Catholic League in France and under Duke Charles III of Lorraine. Blazon: Argent, a capital letter “M” Sable above two cauldrons of the same; a bordure Gules charged with four saltires Or.
	Coat of arms of the Crescia (1680); Like many Albanian stratioti families from Coron, the Crescia served conspicuously in European military campaigns, particularly in the Spanish and Austrian armies. Stefano (1580–1599) enlisted in the light cavalry of Flanders, for the Catholic League in France and briefly under Duke Charles Emmanuel of Savoy. In 1599, he sought compensation from Philip III in Naples but his case remained unresolved as of 1604. Georgio (I) (1561–1617), son of Teodoro, spent over 30 years in the cavalry. He captured French general La Noue at Roeselare (1580) and was wounded at Zutphen (1586). Between 1599 and 1617, he sought overdue wages and the 10,000 scudi reward for La Noue’s capture, attempted to raise an Albanian cavalry for Spain and took part in an expedition to Cyprus. Georgio (II) (1581–1603) was wounded at Tournai (1581), later fighting in Burgundy and Sicily. Forced into retirement due to deafness, he was granted a modest pension in Naples. Paolo (I) (1593–1606), son of Teodoro and brother of Georgio (I), came from a long line of military officers. Following his father’s death, he unsuccessfully sought the family pension and noble entitlements. Later, he raised troops for Milan but fell into debt and was awarded a small stipend. Paolo (III) (1596–1621), son of Georgio (I), was appointed to lead a cavalry unit but lost command due to his age. In 1621, he pursued unpaid wages related to his father’s service. Paolo (IV) (1600–1604), a veteran soldier in Flanders, was eventually discharged and granted a reduced pension in Naples. Pietro (1596–1602), a cavalry lieutenant, fought in key battles including Calais (1596) and Amiens (1597). Due to declining health, he sought and eventually received a pension. Teodoro (1561–1593) held the fief of Ururi (Molise) and served Spain in Piedmont, Germany and Flanders. After successfully petitioning for unpaid earnings, he died in 1593. His command was later assigned to Elia Capoisio. Blazon: Azure, a mount in base Vert, thereon a sheaf of three wheat ears proper, the dextermost inflamed, in chief a swallow volant proper, in base a wavy fess Argent.

===== Albania Vèneta =====
Coat of arms	Description
Clockwise: 1905 model; Querini's replica (1671); 1551 model	Coats of arms of the Angeli Flavii Comneni (1551–1905); The Angeli Flavii Comneni, also known as Angeli or Angelori, were a prominent Albanian noble family, mentioned by Georgii Merula in his Bellum Scodrense ad Iacobum Merulam et Franciscum Gambarinum (Venice, 1474) alongside the Radovani, in the context of the Albanian wars. The family traced its lineage to Andrea, voivode of Drivasto, who claimed descent from Byzantine royalty. Andrea was the father of Pauli, Archbishop of Durazzo. He was closely related to several leading Albanian noble houses, mainly the Dukagjini, Spani, Cernovichi and Dusmani. According to Sansovino, Count Andrea defeated the famed Albanian warrior Georgio Castriota in 1448. Another of Andrea’s sons, Pietro, served with distinction as a captain under the Venetian banner. His line produced a later Pauli, who became Count of Drivasto and Lord of Antivari. Pauli had three sons: Angelo, whose son Giovanni was the father of Count Andrea Angeli Radovani, consul in Toscana; Andrea, known as “Chiorri” who founded a branch of the family at the Bay of Cattaro; Pietro, who became imperial consul of Scutari in 1696. Pauli’s brother, Pietro, persecuted by the Ottoman authorities was responsible for the downfall of the Angelori branch in Scutari. Nicolò, son of Angelo and brother of Giovanni, served as Archbishop of Sofia and later of Durazzo until 1752. His cousin, Basilio Angeli Radovani, acted as his vicar general. Georgio Angeli Radovani was appointed Bishop of Scutari in 1771. A genealogical tree of the family was compiled in 1785 by Vincenzo Alessandro Costanzi, archivist of the Sacred Congregation for the Propagation of the Faith. It begins with Ghiécci Angelori (Georgio Angeli) in 1565 and traces the lineage to Andrea, who at the time resided in Ancona, while other branches remained in Scutari. The family’s coat of arms features a standing angel holding a palm branch, supported by a double-headed eagle and topped with a comital crown. The Angeli of Napoli and the Craveggia also descend from this line of the Angeli dynasty. Blazon: An oval escutcheon enclosing an angel proper affronté, wings elevated and addorsed, holding in the dexter hand a palm frond; the escutcheon environed by a border of pearls and resting upon a carved pedestal proper. The whole supported by a bicephalous eagle displayed and regardant, ensigned with a comital coronet. Andrea (II) bolstered the family's claims to the Byzantine throne by publishing in 1551 his fictional antiquarian work "Genealogia d'imperatori romani et constantinopolitani et de regi prencipi et signori che da Isatio Angelo & Vespasiano...", thereon, earning the approval of Pope Paul III. Despite a slew of papal bulls and documents recognizing their imperial lineage and granting them titles such as "Counts of Drivasto" and "Dukes of Durazzo", doubts persisted over their authenticity. As it was later revealed, the Angelis had resorted to forging rescripts in favor of their fictional ancestors, erroneously dating them to 1293, instead of the accurate period which coincided with Emperor Michael VIII Palaiologos' reign (1261–1282). Blazon: Within an oval escutcheon inscribed with the motto ‘DEVS EST TOTI OPERIS AC MVNDI PRÆSVL DOMINIO REGITAE E NICHIL MICHI DEERIT,’ a bicephalous eagle displayed Sable, crowned Or, bearing an inescutcheon Argent charged with an angel Proper, vested and nimbed, elevating a palm frond. Above the whole, an angel Proper, crowned Or, the dexter hand grasping a palm frond, the sinister hand holding a globus cruciger. The legend of the Sacred Military Constantinian Order of Saint George arose in the latter half of 16th century Venice with this very family, whose descendants would for decades successfully exploit their "Byzantine myth", publishing fantastic literature on the history of the Order, awarding European aristocrats and granting them diplomas for priories and commanders in Cilicia, Cappadocia, Hierapolis and other exotic lands in exchange for monetary compensation. A later rendition of the coat of arms attributed to their namesake is in fact associated with the noble Querini family, as depicted in the 1671 work by Jacopo Zabarella, titled "Il Galba, overo Historia della sereniss. fameglia Quirina..."
	Coat of arms of the Crutta (1830); The last kings of Poland were represented at the Sublime Porte by the Albanian lineage of the Crutta, whose genealogy in all likelihood goes back farther than the diploma of «amplissima nobilitas», issued to them at the beginning of the 17th century by La Serenìssima, while they were still serving as Stratioti in Antivari (Dulcigno), on the coast of the Adriatic. The Crutta brothers, Pierre and Antonio, entered the services of King Stanisław Poniatowski, after he had reorganized his diplomatic mission in Lepanto. Together, they founded the Polish Oriental School of Istanbul and took part in the Kościuszko Uprising. The council meeting of 1775, in Warsaw, acknowledged their Venetian nobility and also granted them Polish nobility, that is to say... nativeness. Polyglots and men of letters, the Cruttas left behind several manuscripts related to philology. At the end of a very long and active career, after having survived the era of division within Poland and the Napoleonic Wars, Antonio Crutta died at the castle of Lewiczyn, in the home of his son-in-law, Count Bedlinski. His white marble tomb, decorated with the Venetian coat of arms of his family, survived with its Latin epitaph. Located in the north-western part of the parish cemetery in Lewiczyn, an obelisk carved in sandstone, in the form of a Doric column, rises, topped with an urn, partially covered by a spire, decorated in a vine garland. Above the epitaph inscription that describes the names of Antoni Krutta (d.1812) and that of his daughter, Eliza – married to general Wojciech Piotr Bedliński – there are two precisely carved coats of arms: Blazon (1): Or, a dove displayed Sable, grasping in its talons a heart Gules, in chief a bar Azure charged with three mullets of six points Or. The shield surmounted by a helm crowned with a coronet of rank, above which a crest featuring a mullet of six points Or, accompanied by a scroll bearing the inscription ‘VICTOR’. Blazon (2): Or, a bison’s head cabossed Sable, armed of the same. The shield surmounted by a coronet of rank, above which a crest of three ostrich feathers Argent, issuing from a coronet, with a scroll bearing the inscription ‘I TO MINIE’.

===== Ragusa =====
Coat of arms	Description
	Coat of arms of the Spani (1884); The Spani were a noble Albanian family that emerged during the 14th century. Originating from Drivasto, they were involved in trade and gradually became major landowners. The family settled in Curzola, where it was listed in the official register of nobility as early as 1553, although it had not yet obtained imperial recognition. In 1680, Jacobus Spani studied in Padua under Hechte and Hess and displayed his coat of arms in the university hall. Nicolaus served as bishop in the island of Curzola from 1673 until 1707. Of possible Spanish lineage, as their name would suggest, a brief profile of their family origin is given in Du Cange's "Illyricvm Vetvs & Novum Sive Historia": SPANORUM IN ALBANIA STEMMA The anonymous author of the deeds of the great Scanderbego, is of the constant opinion among the Albanians, that the Spaniorum derived their origin from Hispania and to that extent from the family of the great Theodosii. Andreas Spanus, duke and count of Drivastensis, married Agnete Arianitæ, the daughter of Comnenus. The coat of arms of the Spani is described as follows: Blazon: Per fess Argent and Azure; in chief a dexter arm embowed proper vested Gules, the hand grasping a sword proper hilted Or; in base three cinquefoils Gules.
	Coat of arms of the Dondazani (16th century); The Dondazani, also known as Dondazano and Dondanizi, were a noble Albanian family active in Ragusa during the 12th century. Renowned for their heroic deeds, imposing physical stature and olive complexion, they were prominent figures in the political and social life of the city. The family lineage met its end in 1212 with Petrom Dondazanom. Blazon: Or, a chevron Gules, in chief two roses Azure.
	Coat of arms of the Luccari (1873); The Luccari migrated from Alessio to Ragusa in 914, mentioned in archival records as hailing from Lasia di Slabia. Konstantin Jireček notes the prevalence of the family name but provides no clarity on their origin. In the antiquarian work "La Storia di Ravgia", reprinted in 1903, the Luccari are mentioned in page six as a family from Alessio, in Albania. Noteworthy members included Stefano de Lucaris, a Ragusan nobleman witnessing a power of attorney in 1407 and Giacomo, son of chronicler Pietro Luccari, who published a significant treatise in 1605, shedding light on Ragusa's history and its connection to Albanian events, including those involving Skanderbeg. Of particular interest is the reference to an obscure medieval author by the name of Angiolo di Drivasto, who, alongside Marino di Scutaro, are cited by Luccari detailing an event in 1435 which recounts the expulsion of the Turks from Arbanon by Andrea Thopia. Blazon: Ermine, a bend Gules charged with three fleurs-de-lis Or. The escutcheon surmounted by a barred helm affronté, mantled Ermine and crested with a plume of five ostrich feathers, the first and fifth charged with a bend Gules.
	Coat of arms of the Mexa (1873); The Mexa were an Albanian family of merchants from Scutari. The widow of one Petri Mexa is documented in the land registry of 1445, claiming property formerly endowed to her which had been granted to Vito Jonima, in compensation for his dwellings expropriated to build the barbican at the main entrance of the Mexa family stronghold. A faction of the family later settled in Cattaro and by 1449, gained a seat at the local council. Blazon: Per bend, the chief barry, a bird volant bendwise; the base charged with two mullets of six points, all within a bend sinister. The escutcheon surmounted by a helm affronté, mantled and lined, crested with three ostrich feathers issuing from a ducal coronet. Giuseppe Valentini in his work "Sviluppi Onomastico–Toponomastici Tribali Delle Comunità Albanesi in Sicilia" published in 1955, attempts to establish a connection between the Mexa family of Dalmatia and the Messi tribe of Scutari that later settled in Sicilia: The Messi would follow, as Sufflay suspects, forming a tribe in the Middle Ages (Mesha?); certainly a «sevastus Petrus Messia» or «Misie» appears among the Albanian dynasts or «barons» in negotiations with the Kingdom of Naples in 1272 and 1274; numerous «Mesia, Messa, Messi» are mentioned in the Scutarino Land Registry of 1416–17; a Petri Mexa of Scutari is remembered in 1445 and a Vucha Messi figures in 1614 as head of the village of Muriqi near Scutari... The Mexa branch of Labovë, known with the surname Meksi, was one of the largest and most influential families in Spetses and across the Aegean islands, having established their presence in the region since the early 18th century. In 1769, Theodhori Meksi distinguished himself in the war against the Ottomans. His son, Haxhijani (1754–1844), played a crucial role in coordinating military and economic efforts between Spetses and the neighboring islands of Hydra and Psara, during the Greek revolution of 1821. As the island's first governor, he established a maritime navigation company and spearheaded shipbuilding production. Among their vessels, Shkrepëtima ('Lightning') became renowned for its exceptional speed. The Meksi family maintained a close bond with the legendary heroine Laskarina Bouboulina, who deeply valued the Labovites for their loyalty.
Model 1 Model 2	Coats of arms of the Scura (1873); The name Scura is toponymically linked to the region between present-day Tirana and Durrës, documented by Marin Barleti as Scuria. In 1294, Progron of Sgouro is mentioned as the restorer of the church of the Virgin Peribleptos in Ohrid. Marco Scura became archbishop of Durazzo in 1652. The Dalmatian branch of the family likely originated from Dulcigno, as declared by Zuane, son of Zorzi, in a debt confession dated July 6, 1568. Geronima, daughter of Niccolo Scura and widow of captain Pietro of Cattaro, settled in Iadera in 1594. Reverend Dimitri was buried at the Lazzaretto on October 9, 1649. Georgio Scura, companion in arms of Michele Crutta, served as governor of the Epirotic fleet at the Battle of Candia, under the banner of La Serenìssima. A different branch of the family settled in Calabria, in the provincial town of Vaccarizzo Albanese. From here came Pasquale Scura, a prominent lawyer and attorney general who was appointed Minister of Grace and Justice in 1860 by then dictator Giuseppe Garibaldi. A narrow street located in the historic Spanish quarter of Napoli bears his name. The Scura family coat of arms, in two illustrations, is depicted in Friedrich Heyer von Rosenfeld's "Wappenbuch des Königreichs Dalmatien", published in 1873. Blazon (1): Per bend sinister Argent and Or, a bend sinister embattled Sable; in dexter chief, a raven displayed Sable; in sinister base, a tower embattled proper. A raven Sable statant atop a torse Argent and Sable, resting upon a helm of the same, between two bovine horns Argent, adorned in fess Sable. Blazon (2): In an escutcheon contourné, a bicephalous eagle displayed Sable; surmounted by a dexter-facing helm proper, adorned with wings elevated and addorsed. The symbol of a lion rampant, found on a tombstone at the Monastery of St. Antonious in 1907 by Austrian consul Theodor Ippen, is speculatively attributed to the Scura and later included in the flag and coat of arms of Tirana.
	Coat of arms of the Sorgo (1873); The Sorgo were one of the oldest noble families in Ragusa, mentioned in Serafino Razzi's 1595 work titled "La Storia di Ravgia" as a family from Redoni in Albania. Legend has it that they derived their family name from having imported a large quantity of sorghum to Ragusa in times of famine, at the end of the 13th century. Aggregated to the sovereign patriciate in 1272 and later listed in the Gotha Almanac, they provided the Republic with several high ranking state officials and accomplished prose writers between the 14th and 15th centuries. Their nobility was recognized by the House of Habsburg in 1817, although the main branch became extinct by the late 19th century. The family coat of arms is featured in Friedrich Heyer von Rosenfeld's "Wappenbuch des Königreichs Dalmatien", published in 1873. Blazon: Per bend sinister Argent and Sable, three bendlets counterchanged. Upon a helm affronté, mantled Sable doubled Argent, a torse of the same, surmounted by a coronet proper, from which rise three pinecones (thistles) proper.
	Coat of arms of the Bosdari (1873); The Bosdari were a noble Ragusan family of Albanian origin, later established in Bologna and Ancona, where they were formally recognized among the Italian nobility. Bearing the titles of Count, Nobles of the Holy Roman Empire (Nobile del Sacro Romano Impero) and Patricians of Ancona, their family name is well documented in official registers and cited in the Libro d'Oro (1916–1919). Michelangelo Bosdari (b. 1654) distinguished himself within the Capuchin Order for his intellect, sanctity and eloquence. Rising through the ranks to become a preeminent friar, he eventually held the highest office, unanimously elected General of the Order in 1712. Francesco was granted a diploma of nobility from the Austrian court, on 4 July 1753. His grandson, Giovanni, was appointed Imperial Royal Chamberlain in 1835. Count Alessandro served as Ambassador to Berlin and briefly as Governor of Rhodes from August 17, 1921 until 15 November 1922. Maurizo was an art dealer who sold valuable artworks and sculptures to J. P. Morgan, working for Lockett Agnew under the assumed name A. Bremont. Blazon: Per bend sinister Or and Azure, in chief a mullet of eight points Gules and in base a dolphin embowed Argent; out of a ducal coronet Or, a mullet of eight points of the same.
	Coat of arms of the Vitali (1873); Nicola Ragnina traces the origins of the Vitali family to Dulcigno, mentioning that it died out in the 14th century. He identifies Pere Ufl Vital, a member of Ragusa's Council of the Pregati in 1304, as a possible member of this family but cautions that "Vital" was also a common personal name that appeared frequently in Ragusan records. Another public figure who shared the surname, Bubana de Vitali, served as a cleric and notary to the local archbishop from 1255 to 1262; no further information about him is known. Siebmacher classifies the Vitali as one of the extinct Albanian families of Ragusa. A depiction of their coat of arms appears in Friedrich Heyer von Rosenfeld's Der Adel des Königreichs Dalmatien (vol. IV, part 2, plate 53). Blazon: Or, a bend Gules between one sprig in chief and three in base Vert, each bearing five pendent berries Gules, arranged 1, 2 and 2. Crest: on a wreath Or and Gules, a sprig as in the arms between two wings displayed Or, each charged with a bend Gules, the bends rising inward. Mantling Gules doubled Or.
	Coat of arms of the Burmazi (1700); The Burmazi (or Burmazorich) were a pastoral community that had settled in the Stolac region during the first half of the 14th century. Entrusted with garrison and policing duties, they were frequently involved in raiding and plundering. During Venetian rule, the Burmazi became an administrative unit encompassing Boka, Gripuli, Budua and Pastrovichi, with their seat in Cattaro. The earliest mention of the Burmazi appears in Ragusan archives (1300), identified by historian Konstantin Jireček, who linked their name to the Albanian term for “great man”. By 1343, they were engaged in trade, with Ottoman records listing them alongside the Mataruga tribe. Some members of the family converted to Islam to safeguard their possessions, while others migrated to Dalmatia between the 16th and 18th centuries, settling in places such as Cursola, Spàlato, Castella, Sebenico and Ogòrie. Later Venetian and Austrian records confirm their continued presence, documenting landowners, judges and even an 18th-century folk poet named Ante Burmaz. In 1835, the Austrian cadastre recorded several Burmazi families in Upper Ogòrie and Niska, though by the 1948 census, their numbers had dwindled. Blazon: Per fess, in chief Argent an eagle displayed Sable, in base Or a cross pattée Sable encircled by six torteaux in orle, a bend Azure overall; issuant from a ducal coronet Or, a demi-eagle Sable; mantling Sable doubled Argent; a cartouche Azure charged with monogrammed letters Or; inscribed upon a scroll below the escutcheon, the name “BVRMASOVICH”.

===== Istria =====
Coat of arms	Description
	Coat of arms of the Albanese; The Albanese are among the oldest documented Albanian families in Istria, with attestations dating back to the early 15th century. Their family name appears mentioned with a Martinus and Petrus Albanesius, from a list of records “on the inhabitants of Pola (1403)", introduced by Bernardo Benussi in the opening of his Spigolature Polesane. By 1429, a Biaxio Albanexe is listed among the contributing citizens of Capodistria. On 1 March 1431, Hieronymus Albanensis was the first of the Albanese to enter the list of titular nobility. Well integrated into the urban class, its descendants rose to prominent social positions. Schiavuzzi recalls a Capodistrian figure named Antonio Albanese, who served as podestà of Due Castelli (an abandoned medieval settlement in the Pisino valley, near Canfanaro) around 1416–1417. The influence of this family and others, led to the naming of a street in the city called "Calle Albanese", situated between today's Kettejeva and Santorijeva streets, along the garden of the Servite Monastery, which later became Koper's maternity hospital. Blazon: Per pale Azure and Gules, a lion rampant Or, armed and langued Argent, holding in its sinister paw a sword of the same.
	Coat of arms of the Borisi; The noble Borisi family traces its lineage back to ancient times, claiming descent through their maternal line from Hungarian royalty, as mentioned by Constantine Porphyrogenitus in "De Administrando Imperio". Prospero Petronio, in a manuscript later seen by Carli Rubbi, notes that Nicolò Borisi had served as a high-ranking military officer under George Castriota Scanderbeg. In 1443, Nicolò's sons bravely defended Antivari against a Venetian assault, ultimately surrendering the city under honorable terms. Johann Siebmacher classifies the Borisi as counts of Albania in his «grosses und allgemeines Wappenbuch», republished in 1857. Blazon: Per fess: in chief, Azure; in base, Or, two lions rampant addorsed Gules, armed and langued of the field, crowned of the same, supporting a cypress tree Vert, trunked Gules; the dexter lion raising a crown, the sinister lion grasping a scepter in the form of an animal bone. The family eventually settled in Capodistria, where they gained admission to the Major Council on May 1, 1620, with Bernardo having served as general marshal, commanding the troops of the Prince of Transylvania and Moravia. By 1725, they were listed in the Istrian nobility register, bearing the title of Count. The Borisi also produced skilled diplomats. Marc’Antonio achieved the rank of grand dragoman at the Sublime Porte in 1594. Giacinto held the position of secretary to the general captains of the sea, in 1690. Among the wealthiest families in Istria, they held the castle of Loc in Carniola and subsequently acquired the fief of Fontane, between Parenzo and Rovigno, which included the localities of Acquadizza, Monte Pighera and Scoglio Riviera. By the end of the eighteenth century, Count Pietro held the civic office of superintendent of Via Dolfina, the road connecting Capodistria to Trieste, a vital communication route between Venetian and Austrian territories. Some members of the family also made significant contributions to Italian theater, notably Carlo, an actor known for his performances in Venetian dialect. Captain Ferdinando managed the Trieste shipping company "Tripcovich" in 1915. The last heir of the Borisi family name, Giuseppe, died in the late 1960s.
	Coat of arms of the Brati (16th century); The Brati were a noble Albanian family who settled in Capodistria during the 13th century, later attaining the prestigious title of Count, until their lineage ended in 1848. One Alberico Brati held the castle of S. Giorgio from 1251 until 1269, as a pledge from the patriarch Gregorio di Montelongo. By 1300, they were granted the estate of Trebezze as a fief from the Patriarch of Aquileia. Around 1338, the Brati came into possession of the castle of Sipar, eventually relinquishing it to the Rota of Momiano. In 1505, the family received the investiture of the fiefdoms of Covedo and Cristoiano from Bishop Bartolomeo Assonica. Paolo Brancaino, of the late Giovanni Brati, renounced the fiefdom of Castelli near San Servolo in 1539, placing it in the hands of the bishop of Trieste, Pietro Bonomo. Aggregated to the Noble Council on 28 April 1423, they were included in the Register of Nobles on 1 March 1431 with Gaspar de Bratis, as cited by Manzuoli (1611). Sardo Brati practiced typographic art with Panfilo Castaldi in 1461, while Michele served as mayor of Capodistria in 1491. The last family heir, Giovanni Antonio, a lawyer, married Maria Simonetti and was added to the Noble Council on 10 January 1802. The family coat of arms is found in bas-relief on the facade of their 16th century manor. Blazon: Gules, a chevron Argent.
	Coat of arms of the Bruti (16th century); The Bruti were a noble Albanian family, bearing the title of Counts. Their founder, Marco Bruti (b. 1285), was Lord of Durazzo, who in 1361 acknowledged Venetian sovereignty over the city to protect it from the advancing Ottoman armies under Murad I. The Bruti remained in Durazzo until its conquest by the Ottomans in 1501, when Antonio Bruti (b. 1446), married to Oria Kastrioti, was forced into exile, though only his eldest son, Barnabi (b. 1479), successfully escaped to Alessio. Barnabi later married Gioia Capelichio, a member of one of Albania's oldest families and their union produced two sons: Marco and Antonio II, the latter born in 1518. Antonio II settled in Dulcigno, a Venetian stronghold, where he attained noble status. On August 19, 1537, he married Maria Bruni, daughter of Matteo Bruni, the former feudal lord of Scutari. However, when the Ottomans seized Dulcigno, Antonio II was executed by beheading. His sons, Marco and Giacobbe, fled with other Albanian noble families to Capodistria, where they were absorbed into the city's aristocracy. By 1559, under Doge Alvise I Mocenigo, the Bruti were officially inscribed in the Venetian Golden Book of Nobility and in 1575, they were admitted to the Nobles Council of Capodistria. Blazon: Quartered: 1° and 4°, Gules, an arm embowed proper, vested Or, grasping a sword Argent, in chief a scroll Argent inscribed 'LIBERTAS' Sable; 2° and 3°, Azure, in chief a sun in splendor Or, in base a phoenix Argent rising from flames proper; overall an inescutcheon Gules, an eagle displayed Argent, crowned Or. One branch of the family, known as "del Brolo", resided in the neoclassical Bruti Palace on the northern edge of Broli. This line came to an end with the passing of Count-Bishop Agostini, Vicar General Barnabas and Canon Don Bartholomeo. In 1843, Countess Lodovica, widow and heir of Count Barnabi Bruti, bequeathed the family's vast estates in Ubalda and Olm, to the de Almerigotti brothers rather than her own kin. The Bruti family distinguished itself in ecclesiastical, diplomatic and military service. Four members served as bishops: Pietro in Cattaro (1588), Antonio in Dulcigno, Giacomo in Sitanova (1671–1679) and Agostino in Capodistria. Three Bruti men acted as dragomans (diplomatic interpreters at the Ottoman court): Antonio (1446), Barnaba, who became a Knight of the Order of St. Mark (1619) and Bartholomeo (1717). Captain Giacomo Bruti fell heroically in Corfu, in 1715, during the Ottoman siege of the island. In politics, Agostino, Count Bruti of Marco, a Knight of the Order of St. Stephen, served as senator in the Kingdom of Italy (1809). Barnabi, Count Bruti of Marco, held office as podestà (mayor and military officer) of Capodistria from 1816 to 1818, while Barnaba, Count Bruti of Agostini, served two terms in the same post from 1818 to 1822.
	Coat of arms of the Bruni; The Bruni were a noble Albanian family from Scutari, forced to flee the city after its conquest by the Ottomans in 1479. Gasparo Bruni became a Knight of Malta in 1567 and later served as an intelligence emissary for the Order in Ragusa. He commanded the papal flagship in three naval campaigns against the Ottomans between 1570 and 1572 and spent thirteen years as an infantry officer in the papal territory of Avignon. His brother, Giovanni, was appointed Archbishop of Antivari in 1551 and played a key role in the final sessions of the Council of Trent. Following the Ottoman capture of Antivari in 1571, he was taken prisoner and met a tragic fate as a galley slave at the conclusion of the Battle of Lepanto. Their sister, Maria, married Antonio Bruti, a nobleman from Durazzo whose family, like the Brunis, had sought refuge in Dulcigno. Their son, Bartolomeo, rose to prominence in the 1580s as chief minister of Moldavia, serving as the closest advisor to Voivode Petru Schiopul, before meeting his own untimely end in 1592. Gasparo's son, Antonio, authored a manuscript treatise in 1596, detailing the beylerbeylik of Rumeli and the peoples under its rule. Blazon: Azure, a lion rampant contourny and a bear rampant combatant Argent; in chief three mullets of eight points Sable, in base a crescent Argent.
	Coat of arms of the Dranzi (1652); The Dranzi were a noble Albanian family from Scutari. Their coat of arms is displayed on one of the twenty-five tombstones located in front of the main façade of the Church of San Martino in San Lorenzo del Pasenatico, marking the burial site of Captain Domenego Dranzi, as stated in the inscription. The epigraph identifies him as an Albanian from Scutari and mentions that he personally commissioned the monument for himself and his heirs. Below the inscription, the date 20 June 1652 (DIE XX IVNII MDC LII) is engraved. Blazon: Argent, a wyvern displayed and reguardant, its tail nowed, armed and langued Sable; on a chief embattled, a coronet Or between two scrolls affronté.

==== Dicio Pontificia ====
Coat of arms	Description
	Coat of arms of the Bruti Liberati (1929); A family originally from Albania, settling to Ripatransone from Alessio around the end of the 15th century; it included several distinguished members, among whom Pietro, bishop of Treja in Epirus and later of Cattaro, was appointed by Pope Sixtus IV; Francesco, a valiant soldier earned glory at Lepanto alongside Marcantonio Colonna; Ionnò, who in 1521 fought bravely against the Spaniards; Luigi, a prominent jurist; Domenico, mayor of Cossignano; Filippo, who secured the hereditary title of marquis for himself and his descendants at the dawn of the 19th century; Liberato, knight of many equestrian orders and commander of the pontifical troops; Stefano, apostolic commissioner of the Holy House of Loreto and later apostolic delegate of Velletri. The Consulta Araldica recognized this family as nobles since 1908, recorded in the official nobility registry of the Marche region, bearing the titles of Marquis and Nobles of Ripatransone. Blazon: Azure, on a mount of three coupeaux Or, a tree Vert; on a bend Argent, a lion rampant Gules; in chief dexter a mullet Or, in chief sinister a crescent Argent.
	Coat of arms of the Alicorni (1673); The Alicorni were a noble Albanian family who fled the Ottoman advance of their homeland during Pope Pius II’s reign (r. 1458–1464). Seeking refuge in Milan, Pavia, Forlì and eventually Rome, they attained high status through matrimonial alliances with other Italian nobility: among them the Ricci, Cayni, Trivulzi, Pusterla, Colli Aleotti, Leccilio, Colli Armentieri and Capranica. Messer Traiano was a Conservator (one of the three city councillors), who had his residence, today known as Palazzo Alicorni, erected in the rione of Campo Marzio, not far from Piazza del Popolo, at the beginning of the sixteenth century. He left behind two sons, Giovanni Battista and Fabius, who were both appointed knights by the Pope. On July 3, 1584, Giovanni sold the palace to the French cardinal Matteo Contarelli, Datario of Pope Gregory XIII (r. 1572–85). Cornelia was granted the fideicommissum (entailed estate) from a ruling issued by Deacon Dunozzetto on 27 June 1650. The family lineage ended at the dawn of the 20th century with Francesco, the last male heir of Traiano. Blazon: Azure, a unicorn couchant Argent, resting on a hay stock Or, over a mound Vert.
	Coat of arms of the Albani (1757); The Albani family traces its origins to Albania, with Michele Lazii said to have migrated across the Adriatic in 1464, thereafter establishing his residence in Urbino. It was here where his sons, Georgio and Filippo, are thought to have adopted the family name 'Albani'. As the Duchy of Urbino neared its dissolution, the family began forging ties with the Roman Curia, which was preparing to assume control over the duchy's territories. Orazio Albani (1576–1653) was the first to relocate to Rome, serving as an ambassador responsible for negotiating Urbino's devolution to the Apostolic See. His diplomatic acumen earned him the favor of Pope Urban VIII, who appointed him Senator, a position he held with distinction from 1633 to 1645. Orazio's legacy continued through his two sons: Annibale (1682 † 1751), who entered the ecclesiastical ranks, becoming cardinal; and Carlo, whose heir, Giovanni Francesco Albani (1649 † 1721), would rise to prominence as a cardinal, before being elected Supreme Pontiff, taking the name Clement XI. Over the following decades, the Albani lineage continued to strengthen its ecclesiastical and noble standing, producing two more cardinals: Alessandro (1692 † 1779) and Giuseppe (1750 † 1834). Cardinal Alessandro Albani was a prominent patron of the arts and a key figure in the collection and preservation of antiquities during the 18th century. He amassed an extensive collection of ancient sculptures and artifacts, which were housed in his villa on Via Salaria. In 1733, Pope Clement XII purchased Albani's collection, integrating it into the Capitoline Museums. Albani's patronage extended to scholars such as Johann Joachim Winckelmann, a pioneering art historian and archaeologist, who would later serve as his personal librarian. The Albani Palace, acquired from the Mattei family at Quattro Fontane, housed the family library, an invaluable repository of rare manuscripts and books. The family's coat of arms was incorporated into the papal insignia, as evidenced by Filippo Juvarra’s engravings (c. 1722), based on designs by Francesco Fontana. Blazon: Azure, a fess Or, in chief a mullet of the same, in base a mount of three coupeaux Vert. The sculpted representation of the papal coat of arms is conspicuously displayed at the Cortile del Belvedere in the Vatican and at the Fontana del Pantheon in Rome.
	Coat of arms of the Salvadori (1898); The Salvadori were a family of merchants who established their presence throughout the eastern Adriatic region of Marche. Early genealogical records mention that the family settled in Porto San Giorgio in 1477, after fleeing Albania, to escape Ottoman oppression. A 1540 land registry from the territory of Fermo documents the Salvadori family’s estates, referencing their patriarch, Giorgio da Prenta, identified as "Albanese". Prior to his arrival, he had commissioned an altarpiece, the work of renaissance painter Carlo Crivelli, to be placed inside Porto San Giorgio's chapel. Later taking the surname Salvadori, derived from Giorgio’s descendant, Salvatore di Prenta, the family would serve as patrons of the chapel of San Giorgio, where the Crivelli altarpiece remained until 1803. One notable member was Roberto (26 May 1875 – 6 May 1897), a nobleman and law student, son of Count Giorgio and Countess Adela (Emiliani). The family coat of arms is found in the 10th edition of "Calendario d'Oro", published in 1898 by the Italian Heraldic Institute. Blazon: Azure, an eagle Sable crowned Or, between three mullets of the last, two in flanks and one in base; ensigned with a comital coronet.
	Coat of arms of the Scandellari (1792); The Scandellari were an ancient family of Albanian origin, formerly known as Skandellauri, with their surname later Italianized into the above given form. Among its most notable members was Pietro Scandellari (1711–1789), a distinguished painter and scenic designer. His younger brother, Filippo, was an active sculptor in Romagna known for his various works in stucco, terracotta and colored wax. In Bologna he worked at Palazzo Berselli and in the Sanctuary of Santa Maria della Visitazione al Ponte delle Lame. His gilded bronze statuettes were once preserved in the curg of the tabernacle, at the Major Chapel of the church of San Girolamo alla Certosa. The family coat of arms is found in a 1792 Bolognese catalogue of coats of arms by Floriano Canetoli: Blazon: Azure, a tower Gules, masoned, port and windows Sable, supported by two balls Or, surmounted by a third ball of the same, between two greyhounds rampant respectant Gules, collared Argent; in chief to dexter a sun in splendour Or and to sinister a crescent increscent Argent.

==== Genoa, Neapolis, Sicilia... ====
Coat of arms	Description
	Coat of arms of the Argento (1680); The Argento were an ancient noble family of Albania; where an Arsuccio Argento, who distinguished himself as a valiant captain, was the nephew of Giovanni Castriota, Lord of Albania... and held dominion over some good lands. It is believed that from there he moved to the Kingdom of Neapolis. The Argento family name is also found in Pozzuoli. Blazon: Per bend sinister, Argent and Gules, in chief ensigned with a crown Or.
	Coat of arms of the Matranga (1391); The Matranga were a noble Albanian family who settled in Sicilia from Epirus around the late 13th century, so mentioned in the work of Filadelfo Mugnos, titled "Teatro Genologico Delle Famiglie Nobili Titolate Feudatarie Ed Antiche Nobili Del Fidelissimo Regno Di Sicilia Viventi Et Estinte" (vol.2), published in 1655. One notable heir, Giovanni Matranga, was under the services of King Martino, from whom he obtained in compensation the territory of Morgana and the office of royal provisioner in the city of Castrogiovanni, wherein his lineage was consolidated by 1391. His son, Giacomo, would later acquire the fiefdom of Mantica, as evidenced from a medieval epitaph on his tomb, located in the church of S. Caterina of the said city. The family lineage met its end with Giacomo III around 1513. The Matranga coat of arms is described as follows: Blazon: A shield Vert, featuring a sinister arm embowed, while grasping a sword Argent in pale, with a crescent of the same in dexter chief.
	Coat of arms of the Durazzo (1757); The Durazzo were one of Genoa’s most illustrious dynasties, tracing their roots to the Albanian port city of Durazzo (modern-day Durrës). Tradition holds that members of this family fled their homeland in the late 14th century amid war and famine. A notarial record from 1387, preserved in Genoa’s civic library, lists several members, among them Pietro, his wife Mariola and Giorgio (son of Andrea), identified as refugees from Albania. A differing account tells of a merchant named Giorgio who escaped Durazzo with his wife and children after the city fell to the Ottomans. Embarking on a Messinese ship bound for Calabria, their fate took an unexpected turn when they were betrayed by the ship’s captain, who sold them into slavery to a certain Manuele Valente of Genoa. Giorgio ultimately secured his family’s freedom through an appeal to Doge Antoniotto Adorno and the ruling elders who, on 25 August 1389, decreed their release and conferred upon them Genoese citizenship, a privilege not easily granted. From these humble beginnings, the Durazzo gradually integrated into Genoese life, aligning with the Guelph faction and entering public service. They rose to prominence through the silk trade, accumulating vast wealth and by 1528 were admitted into the Albergo Grimaldi, confirming their place among the city’s nobility. Their family lineage diverged into two branches, giving rise to numerous statesmen, clerics and patrons of the arts. Among the most distinguished were Stefano, Cardinal of San Lorenzo in Pane e Perna who served as Archbishop of Genoa (1635–1664) and Marcello, Cardinal of Santa Prisca and titular Archbishop of Chalcedon (1686). No fewer than nine members were elected Doge of Genoa, arranged chronologically: Giacomo (1573), Pietro, son of Giacomo (1619), Giambattista (1639), Cesare (1665), Pietro, son of Cesare (1685), Vincenzo (1709), Stefano (1734), Marcello (1767) – ceded the island of Corsica to the Kingdom of France and Girolamo (1802) – elected Doge of the Ligurian Republic under Napoleon I, later serving as senator of the French Empire. Beyond politics, the Durazzo left an enduring cultural legacy. Genoa's first theaters — including the Falcone, le Vigne and Sant’Agostino — owe their existence to the family’s patronage. Its contributions to public welfare are commemorated in numerous statues and inscriptions, recognizing their generosity toward institutions such as Casa di San Giorgio and Albergo dei Poveri of Carbonara. The family's grand palace on Via Balbi houses a remarkable library and an extensive art collection. Their noble status was further consolidated when, by an official act dated 29 April 1624, Ferdinando Gonzaga, Duke of Mantua and Monferrato, granted Agostino (son of Doge Giacomo) the fiefs of Gabiano, Cerrina and Pian Cerreto, elevating them to a marquisate with hereditary rights. In 1786, they were bestowed the title Marquises of Pontinvrea. Blazon: The ancestral crest of the Durazzo is frequently rendered upon a 17th century escutcheon of the scroll variant. Set against a field Azure and embellished by bands Argent Gules, with a trine of fleurs-de-lis Or, arranged in succession.
Clockwise: Lucanian model; Galvani's model (1884); Venetian model (1550)	Coats of arms of the Giura (1550–1920); The Giura were an ancient Lucanian family, of Albanian origin. Their earliest known ancestor, Messer Domenico Giura, was a knight who took part during the Sixth Crusade in the Holy Land (1229) alongside Emperor Frederick II. In 1266, Marco Giura fought at the Battle of Benevento and was rewarded with a quartered coat of arms, incorporating the insignia of the House of Anjou. By 1415, Giovanni Giura had distinguished himself as a captain under King Alfonso of Aragon, earning the privilege of adding the Aragonese coat of arms to his own. Georgio received the title of Baron by Emperor Charles V. Blazon: Quartered: 1° and 4°, Or, four bendlets Sable, between them ermine tails in pale; 2° and 3°, Gules, five gouttes Argent. Other prominent members of this family include Basilio, who served as a royal page in the 15th century, along with his brother Demetrio, a cavalry captain. His son, also Demetrio, rose to the rank of General under King Ferrante I of Aragon. Attanasio, Demetrio’s son, was admitted to the royal court of Charles V in 1472 as a court official and dining companion, being granted noble status in 1522. By the 18th century, the family had relocated to Castronuovo, in Lucania, where its members played important civic and intellectual roles. Saverio (b. 1765) served as a notary, while Giuseppe Andrea was listed among the 304 candidates eligible for the National Parliament. Alessandro (1826–1878), a poet, scholar and mayor of Castronuovo, is remembered for his unpublished historical writings. Domenico, from Maschito in Basilicata, served as a judge in the criminal court of the province. Rosario held the post of attorney general at the criminal courts of Trani and Aquila, later dying in political exile, in Nice. Luigi Giura, a distinguished mathematician and general inspector of the Administration of Roads in Napoli, designed the first suspension bridge in continental Europe (1832). He also briefly served as Minister of Public Works in Garibaldi’s government, alongside Arbëreshë luminaries, Francesco Crispi and Pasquale Scura. In the 19th century, three brothers from Chiaromonte emerged as symbols of courage and patriotism. Giosuè, a fervent nationalist, died in exile, leaving behind his son Giovanni, who later became a prefect in Salerno (1884–1890). Domenico, a renowned humanist and poet, had his poem "Ricordo della Patria d'Origine" republished by Ernest Koliqi in the 1964 edition of the magazine "Shejzat", issue no. 11–12, p. 506. Lodovico Nicola, a sinologist, served as mayor of Chiaramonte from 1931 until 1947. The town's Archaeological Anthropological Museum is named after him. The title of Baron and the family’s coat of arms were officially recognized by Royal Decree on 25 April 1920. King Umberto II, by motu proprio, on 24 June 1978, conferred the title of Marquis of Polla upon Gerardo Giura (1932–1997) and Marquis of Battifarano upon Fabrizio Giura (b. 1934), both bearing the honorific Don. Blazon: Argent, in chief a bee Or volant, in base a mount of three peaks proper. The escutcheon ensigned with a coronet and supported by two cherubs (putti) displayed, wings addorsed. Below, a scroll bearing the motto ‘MODVS ET ORDO’ in capital letters. The Dalmatian branch of this family came to be identified with one Daniel Jurich, Voivode of Scutari, who was appointed by Venetia to command its forces following a territorial dispute between the Republic and Skanderbeg, after Lech Ducagini had seized Daine. Jurich's troops included reinforcements from Lech Dusmani and Peter Spani and consisted of Sclavonian cavalry, gendarmes and Albanians loyal to Venetia. The family coat of arms is elegantly depicted in a colored illustration found in the work by F. A. Galvani, titled "Il Re d'Armi di Sebenico" (Vol.1), published in 1884. Blazon: Per fess Or and Azure, a goat rampant Argent.
	Coat of arms of the Masci (1792); The Masci or Masi were a noble family of military distinction, active in southern Italy since the Late Middle Ages. Several members of this family rose to prominence as condottieri and officers employed by the Kingdom of Naples. Among them was Niccolò Masi, who commanded a cavalry unit of 500 horsemen (stratioti). His military reputation was established following skirmishes near Castrio, after which he entered the service of Ferrante I of Aragon. Jurist and intellectual Angelo Masci (1758–1822) was noted for his scholarly work on the history and origins of the Albanian people. The surname Masci is thought to derive from an ancient epichoric term meaning foal or young horse. This etymology is reflected in the family’s funerary symbolism: the noble sepulchre of the Masci family, still preserved in the Albanian village of Santa Sofia d'Epiro, features a sculpted foal as its emblem. Their coat of arms is included in a Bolognese heraldic catalogue by Floriano Canoteli. A copy of the handcrafted watercolor engraving is housed at the Archiginnasio Library. Blazon: Azure, a tree eradicated Proper; a foal rampant Argent climbing the trunk. In chief a fess Gules charged with three fleurs-de-lis Argent.
	Coat of arms of the de Floreo (1876); The de Floreo family traces its lineage to Galeotto Franco Florea of Scutari, Lord of Albania. Dispossessed of their lordship by invaders in the 12th century, his descendants migrated to Italy, joining the Mazzuca and Cessarione families who settled in Venetia and later towards the end of the 14th century, in Manfredonia. Another branch of the family, from Spalatro or Cattaro, settled in Friuli in 1460. Listed in the Barons of Terra del Lavoro in 1239, they obtained numerous privileges and fiefdoms, including Cantalupo, Montagano, Oppido, Palma, Roccaguadagna, Santangelo, among others. Their family coat of arms is depicted in the 1876 biographical work titled "Memorie delle Famiglie Nobili delle Province Meridionali d'Italia (vol.3)" by Count Berardo Candida-Gonzaga. Blazon: Per fess Argent and Azure, a bicephalous eagle displayed Sable; below, a lion rampant Or, charged on its head with a four-pointed label of the same; in base Gules, a bend Or from which three bendlets of the same issue.
	Coat of arms of the Secondo; The Secondo were a family of nobles, originally from Albania, who, alongside Scanderbeg (Duke of Croia), came to Neapolis with other troops to the aid of King Ferrante I of Aragon, against the rebel barons. Once the civil war was quelled, Georgio Secondo and his family settled in Lucera, where they enjoyed nobility status. He obtained the fiefdom of Palmori, becoming sworn Master, a position held by the nobles and later served as lieutenant governor of Lucera. Giuseppe, author of the "Public Life of the Romans", was appointed governor of the Capitanata province and judge of the Sommaria. Blazon: Per pale: Argent, a dexter arm Proper embowed, grasping a sheaf of wheat Or; sinister, Azure, a balance Or fesswise between two mullets of six points of the same.
	Coat of arms of the Staffa; The Staffa family of Apulia, originally from Albania and belonging to the highest nobility, bore the surname Staif, later Italianized to Staffa. They migrated to Neapolis when the armies of Bayezid II, Emperor of the Turks, subjugated Albania in 1492. A branch of the family set foot in Trani, where they were recognized as nobles by the Seggio dei Longobardi and Portanova. Another branch migrated to Calabria before finally settling in Trinitapoli. Nicola Staffa, as head of the colony of seven families, among them: the Candreva, Fionda, Gliossi, Manes, Musacchio and Scuragreco, founded the calabrian town of Falconara Albanese. Blazon: Or, of roe deer Gules, charged with three mullets Argent, each of six rays.
	Coat of arms of the Tafuri (1701); The Tafuri lineage, originally from Albania, produced notable figures during the Rennaisance period and beyond. Matteo was a philosopher, astrologer and physician, renowned for his learning in divination and esoteric sciences, later developing a controversial reputation as a magician and practitioner of the occult. Raffaele, as a painter was celebrated for his luminous coastal and landscape scenes. His works are held in various Italian museums, including the Museum of Art, in Avellino and the Leonardo da Vinci Museum of Science and Technology, in Milan. Manfredo emerged as an influential Marxist architect, theoretician and critic, widely regarded as one of the most important architectural historians in the second half of the 20th century. Blazon: Quarterly. 1° and 4°, Or, two bars Gules; 2° and 3°, Azure, upon three mounts Or a tree Vert, between two lightning bolts Gules.
	Coat of arms of the Niutta; Originally from Albania, the Niutta family settled in Calabria in the 14th century, rising to prominence in law, military service and public administration. Vincenzo Niutta, a highly esteemed jurist, served as President of the Supreme Court of Justice for the Kingdom of the Two Sicilies and later was appointed the first President of the Court of Cassation in Naples, following the Italian unification. On 8 November 1860, he proclaimed the controversial Plebiscite results, sanctioning the annexation of the former Kingdom into the Savoy monarchy. A street in Naples is named in his honor. Other members of the Niutta family achieved high ranks in the judiciary, including Domenico, Ilario, Nicola and Francesco, the last of whom served as President of the Court of Cassation in the early 20th century. In military service, Ugo Niutta, a lieutenant aviator, was posthumously awarded the gold medal for Military Valor after falling in aerial combat during World War I. A street in Naples also bears his name. The Niutta were ennobled as Dukes (1722) and Marquises of Marescotti (1719). Giovanni Niutta held the post of Vice-Prefect and Vice-Podestà of Naples during the Fascist era (1922–1943). In 1922, the family were listed in the Golden Book of Italian Nobility. Blazon: Per fess Argent and Azure, in chief three roses Gules, in base a mullet of six points Argent.
	Coat of arms of the Rodotà; The Rodotà family of San Benedetto Ullano is among the oldest and most distinguished Albanian families in Italy. With ancestral roots in Coron (Morea), they actively resisted Ottoman rule in the 15th and 16th centuries, playing a significant role in Charles V and Admiral Andrea Doria’s campaigns to restore Christian dominion in the region. For their valor in battle, they were invited to settle in the Kingdom of Naples, where they received noble titles, privileges and the prestigious rank of "Cavalier", allowing them the honor of bearing arms in the King's presence. Niccarone, also known as Nicca, was the family's progenitor. His descendants, Giandomenico and Giacomo, participated in significant military endeavors during the 17th century. Felice Samuele was appointed Archbishop of Berea. Author Pietro Pompilio served as professor of Greek language at the Vatican Library and as lawyer in the Roman Curia. Abbot Vincenzo was appointed president of the College of Sant’Adriano in 1849. Stefano Rodotà (1933–2017) was a prominent jurist and politician. A professor of civil law at the University of Rome from 1966, he founded the journal "Politica del diritto". He would serve as a member of parliament from 1979 to 1994 and later as the first president of the Italian Data Protection Authority (1997–2005). Rodotà was instrumental in drafting the Charter of Fundamental Rights of the European Union, adopted in Nice on 7 December 2000. Blazon: Sable, a chevron enhanced Argent, in chief a rose between two mullets of eight points and in base a pair of compasses extended, all of the second.
	Coat of arms of the Mazzuca (1875); The Mazzuca name belongs to an ancient Albanian noble family that settled in the province of Cosenza during the 16th century, having migrated there from Coron, in Morea (Peloponnese). Recognized among the prominent Arbëreshë families of Italy, their family lineage is said to have descended from one of the seven distinguished generals who accompanied Skanderbeg to the Kingdom of Naples, in support of King Ferrante I against the Angevins. Prominent members of this family include Carla, a journalist and politician who served as former president of the UNESCO Club of Rome; Giancarlo, former board member of RAI; Mario, a lawyer and recipient of the Golden Star for Sporting Merit as a rugby pioneer; Federica, surgeon and oncologist, professor at La Sapienza University. Blazon: Argent, three bendlets Gules; overall an eagle displayed Sable.
	Coat of arms of the Spoto (1915); The Spoto family is of Albanian origin. Following the Ottoman invasion of their homeland, they sought refuge in Sicilia, settling in Sant'Angelo Muxaro around 1515. By the 18th century, the Spoto had become one of the most prominent families in the region. Their influence is evident in the founding of the Church of Carmelo, where their family crypt remains, along with a marble statue of Canon Giovanni Spoto (d. 1793). Domenico (1729–1809) was a leading ecclesiastical figure of his time. After serving as Canon of Agrigento from 1761, he was appointed Bishop of Lipari (1802) and later Cefalù (1804), a role he held until his passing in 1809. Their rise to nobility culminated with Giacomo the Elder, who in 1773 acquired the fief of Salacio from Prince Pignatelli Aragona Cortes through an emphyteutic lease. His feudal investiture followed on October 11, 1791, granting him the title Lord of Salacio. The family’s noble status was formally recognized in 1899, when Giacomo the Younger was granted the titles Baron of Salici and Lord of Solacio, securing its place in Sicilian aristocracy. Blazon: Azure, two lions rampant combatant crowned Or, supporting a sword in pale of the same, accompanied in chief by three mullets Or.

==== Urbes et regiones ====
Coat of arms	Description
	Coat of arms of the Statutes of Scutari (1330–1469); The original manuscript of the Statutes of Scutari is inscribed on parchment and contains 40 pages. Positioned at the uppermost part is depicted the coat of arms of the city of Scutari. Blazon: The coat of arms features a scudo-shaped design, within which rests a bicephalous eagle Or, adorned with royal crowns on each head, set against a background Azure; on the lower half, three five-leafed rosettes Sable, set against a background Or. Above the heraldic image, from the left, a one-headed eagle Sable, standing on a headwear Sable, with outstretched wings and an open beak, distinguished by a thin tongue Gules; from the right, a canine Argent, standing on a headwear Sable, clenching on a bone, a banner Argent with the inscription FATIS•CEDO• (Latin: Fate yielded), hovering above; the whole, decorated with florals Gules Azure Or. An interpretation of the symbolism reveals a proud vulture, signifying the city's affluent past. The craving canine appears content with the bone it receives — a metaphorical representation of Scutari's subjugated state following the Ottoman conquest.
	Coat of arms of the Albanian domains (1694); A 1694 map of the Balkans, attributed to Venetian cartographer Pietro Antonio Pacifico and published in Venice during the Morean War, depicts, among others, a coat of arms featuring a red shield charged with a black double-headed eagle. The vertical black lines visible on the shield are not part of the armorial design. They represent the engraver’s hatching, a common early modern convention used in printed maps and heraldic illustrations to indicate the tincture. The emblem appears south of Albanopoli and east of the Ducagini highlands, encompassing large sections of the Albanian domains. Blazon: Gules, a double-headed eagle displayed Sable. The Morean War (1684–1699) was a conflict fought in the Peloponnese (Morea), primarily between the Republic of Venice and the Ottoman Empire. It was part of the wider Great Turkish War, which involved several European powers aiming to push back against Ottoman territorial expansion in Europe. Led by the charismatic Venetian Doge, Francesco Morosini (1619–1694), the Venetians captured significant territories, including the cities of Kalamata, Nafplion and Patras, marking a high point in Venetian military achievements.
Ritter's model Galvani's model	Coat of arms of Venetian Albania (1701–1884); A printed brochure presented in Cyrillic characters, from the work of Hristofor Žefarović, portrays the heraldic symbol of Albania in detail: Blazon: Azure, a castle of three turrets Argent, masoned Sable, crenelated with windows of the same, upon a mount in base Vert; the escutcheon ensigned by a royal crown Argent. This illustration was in fact borrowed from an earlier work by Paulo Ritter, published in 1701 and found at the University of Bologna archives, with the Latin inscription as follows: The old White Castles bestowed their names upon the Kingdom: Renewing the wealth of the Kingdom of Castriotes akin to thieves of old, Slightly nourished the King and his grandfather's realm: Undoubtedly, white was a perilous color. F.A.Galvani in his work "Il Re D'Armi di Sebenico", published in Venetia in 1884, presents a different variation of the coat of arms, depicting a red lion, described as such by Casimiro Freschot: Blazon: Argent, a lion rampant Gules. Both illustrations are found in the 1873 catalog titled "Wappenbuch des Königreichs Dalmatien" by Carl Georg Friedrich Heyer von Rosenfeld.
	Coat of arms of Albania Sallentina (1803); Of the settlements that make up the Diocese of Taranto, there are a few, in which the local inhabitants speak a variety of the Albanian language among themselves, namely: San Crispieri, Faggiano, Roccaforzata, San Martino, Monteparano and San Marzano. Tarentum in the times of Magna Graecia was famous for the glory of its armies, in their plight against the Lucanians, the Bruttians, the Samnites, the Messapians and the Sallentini, all under Roman command. To counter this existential threat, the Tarentinians and their allies requested military aid from the Epirotes, led by King Pyrrhus, who arrived with an army of more than 25,000 soldiers. The subsequent waves of Albanian migration did not boast of the remnants of such prodigious antiquity and were of a later origin, emerging in times gone by. Therefore, we are inclined to believe that the introduction of their language to this region should be attributed towards the first half of the 16th century, more specifically to the year 1530... when, many noble families of Albania, having abandoned their homeland to escape Ottoman tyranny, migrated to Apulia, under the protection of the catholic king Ferranto of Aragon and his successor. Among these families were the Basta, from which came the famous warrior, leader of armies and valiant writer of learned works, Georgio Basta, a branch of whose family came to settle here and held dominion over several fiefdoms such as San Martino, Monteparano, Civitella.. etc. The coat of arms of Albania Sallentina is depicted in an 1803 atlas, conceived in the form of a seal by Canon Giuseppe Pacelli of Manduria, whose name is inscribed in the outer circlet of the oval base. Blazon: Within an oval border inscribed with the motto "IOSEPHVS CANONICVS PACELLI MANDVRIENSIS", a bicephalous eagle displayed, each head crowned, wings addorsed and elevated. Upon the eagle’s breast, an escutcheon per bend sinister, charged in chief with a letter or cipher and in base with another letter or cipher. In chief, above the eagle, a radiant sun or a mullet of multiple points. The eagle’s talons grasp a bundle of fasces or rods crossed in saltire and bound at their base.

=== Habsburg Empire ===
Coat of arms	Description
	Coat of arms of Georgio Calambriae (1536); Georgio Calambriae was a 16th-century Albanian military captain and imperial court servant (Hofdiener) in the service of Emperor Charles V. Little is known about his life beyond the surviving record of the coat of arms granted to him. In the said document, issued on 14 January 1536, he is identified as "Georgius Calambriae Albanus", describing him as the emperor's captain and familiar court servant. Charles [V] ... to the magnificent Georgius Calambriae Albanus, our beloved captain and familiar [courtier] ... and [we grant] to the aforesaid Georgius these arms and insignia: Blazon: Gules, two lions rampant combatant Or supporting between them a tree proper, its branches and foliage Vert; on a chief Argent, an eagle displayed Sable between two mullets of eight points Gules.
	Coat of arms of Nicolao Greco Albano (1536); Charles V, by divine grace Roman Emperor, ever august, King of Germany, Spain and other realms, makes known that Nicolao Greco Albano, his faithful servant, has distinguished himself in deeds of arms and rendered faithful and worthy service unto His Imperial Majesty. Wherefore, in remembrance and consideration of such faithful service, the Emperor has seen fit to honor and distinguish the aforesaid Nicolao by granting unto him arms and ensigns of nobility. Such arms shall bear upon the shield a siren with a double tail, fashioned and disposed in the manner represented in the accompanying figure, bearing objects in her hands. Above the shield shall stand a helmet adorned with its proper mantling and for a crest an arm bearing aloft a sword, all according to the form therein depicted. His Imperial Majesty formally grants these arms to Nicolao Greco Albano, that he and his lawful descendants may henceforth have, hold, bear and display the same freely and without hindrance, whether in battle, tournament, contest, assembly or upon any other fitting and honorable occasion, according to ancient usage and established custom. And no man, of whatsoever estate or dignity, shall presume to hinder or disturb him or his descendants in the lawful possession and bearing of the said arms. Given at Neapolis, on the twentieth day of February, in the Year of Our Lord 1536.
	Coat of arms of the Derra (1741); The Derra were a family of fur traders from Moscopole, in southeastern Albania, who rose to prominence in the 18th century. Their patriarch, Athanas, worked as a cloth merchant in Pesth. By 1741, his successor, Andrea, was granted titular nobility accompanied with a coat of arms certificate by Empress Maria Theresa. Naum obtained the fief of Moroda near Arad and in 1839 received citizenship rights. The Derra, whose linguistic surname means pigs in Albanian, were linked through marriage with the Sina and Popovics-Mocsonyi families. Blazon: Quartererd. 1° and 4°, Argent, a caduceus in pale; 2° and 3°, Azure, a ship under full sail Argent on natural waves, sailing to dexter in the 2° and to sinister in the 3°. Crest: On a helmet affronté Argent, crowned Or with four grilles of the same, tarred three-quarters to dexter, with lambrequins [tinctures unspecified].
	Coat of arms of the Skenderlics (1792); The Skenderlics were an Albanian family of merchants, established in Hungary during the 18th century. Their adopted coat of arms is described as follows: Blazon: Per pale: dexter, Or, an eagle displayed Sable; sinister, Gules, a tower Argent, embattled, pierced with an open door and two windows, set upon a natural rocky terrace Proper; in base, Vert, three wavy bars conjoined, the outer bars Argent and narrower, the central bar Azure and broader, charged with a crescent Argent between two mullets of six points Or; all within a bordure Argent. The shield surmounted by a helm Argent, barred of five and crowned Or, affronté, with mantling dexter Azure and Argent, sinister Gules and Argent.
	Coat of arms of Georgio Basta (1605); Born in Rocca, near Taranto, then Kingdom of Naples, into an Arbëresh family that settled there from Epirus, Georgio Basta (soon to become Count of Huszt and Marmaros) began his military career under the command of Prince Alexander of Parma, later serving in France. He eventually joined the imperial forces, gaining fame through victories over Sigismund Báthory and Bocskai, thus conquering parts of Transylvania and Upper Hungary. Basta became Field Marshal and Governor in Upper Hungary under Emperor Rudolf II, later being granted the title of Imperial Count in 1605. His marble tombstone, featuring a coat of arms and epitaph, was recently uncovered during renovation works at the Minoritenkirche church in Vienna and is depicted in the Regasta Sepulchrorum, as recorded in a handwritten codex detailing his wartime achievements. Blazon: Quartered. 1° and 4°, a knight in full armor mounted on a horse, wielding a lance; 2° and 3°, a bend chequy. Overall, an inescutcheon charged with a bicephalous eagle displayed. The whole surmounted by a ducal coronet.
	Coat of arms of the Lusi (1820); The Lusi descend from a noble lineage that flourished as early as the 13th century in Greece and Albania. A branch of the family settled in the island of Cephalonia, where they built the still-standing Lusi Castle. In 1772, Spiridion Lusi relocated to Prussia, where he was formally recognized with the hereditary title of Count, later joining the free corps as an officer. Following the dissolution of his regiment, he was appointed envoy to London, playing an important role in advancing Prussian trade interests. Later assigned to St. Petersburg, he continued to distinguish himself through diplomatic skill, earning the trust of King Frederick II of Prussia. Lusi remained in active military service until his passing on 1 September 1815, holding the rank of Imperial and Royal Prussian Lieutenant General. Blazon: Per pale, dexter Azure a mullet of six points Argent, sinister Argent a lion rampant regardant Azure, crowned Or. Above the escutcheon, a count’s coronet surmounted by a barred helm affronté, crowned Or, from which rises a demi-lion rampant Azure, also crowned Or. Mantling: Azure doubled Argent. A separate branch of this family migrated to the historic Greci village of Campania, founded by Albanian settlers during the 15th century. The former town hall is today known as Palazzo Lusi. Gennaro Lusi served as chief editor of the newspaper "La Nuova Albania", published since 1898 by the Albanian political committee of Naples, led by Abbot Gerardo Conforti.
	Coat of arms of the Sina (1851); The Sina family were prosperous merchants from Moscopole, in southeastern Albania, who rose to prominence in European finance and aristocracy. After the destruction of the city in 1768, they relocated to Sarajevo, then Vienna, leveraging the Edict of Tolerance to dominate trade in tobacco, cotton and foodstuffs. Simon Sina (1753–1822) built his merchant house into Austria's second-largest financial power, maintaining close ties with Ali Pasha of Yanina, one of his prime benefactors. His son, George (1782–1856), was ennobled in 1818 for contributions to Austria's economy during the Napoleonic blockade. His eldest son, Jean (1804–1869), directed the family's vast financial empire, while his younger son, Simon (1810–1876), expanded their fortune, becoming a key financier of Russian and Greek interests. A major patron of history and the arts, he funded the Academy of Athens, Budapest's Széchenyi Chain Bridge and Austria's war efforts. Despite their immense wealth, Baron Sina's daughters faced hardship. Married into prominent European families – including the Mavrocordatos, Ypsilantis, Wimpffens and the Duke of Castries — they suffered from their husbands’ extravagance, gambling and infidelity, leading to financial ruin. Blazon: Arms: Per pale, dexter Argent an eagle displayed Sable, sinister Or a lion rampant Sable; in base, a volcano erupting amidst waves proper. Crest: Issuant from a barred ducal coronet, three ostrich plumes Argent. Supporters: Two lions rampant guardant Sable. Compartment: A scroll bearing the motto SERVARE INTAMINATUM. Additional Crest: Above the coronet, a lion rampant Sable, armed and langued Gules, brandishing a sword Argent. The surname Sina remains widespread throughout Albania, with a Sina settlement historically inhabited by the Çidhna tribe in the eastern Dibër region. Perhaps unrelated to the aforementioned family, prominent activist of the national revival period, Athanas Sina, served as the second headmaster of the Mësonjëtorja.
	Coat of arms of the Gyra (1819); The Gyra (Ghira) were a noble family originally from Moscopole, in southeastern Albania. Jani Adam Gyra secured a diploma of ennoblement from the Elector of Saxony, leveraging the privilege of great comitive that Electors could exercise. On 18 September 1792, this ennoblement was confirmed by Emperor Francis II, who subsequently issued a second diploma on December 12, 1792, to Demetrio-Anastase, Jani's brother and business associate. On 24 February 1819, Isak Gyra (b.1782 – d. 17 September 1831), son of Demetrio-Anastase, who owned the estate of Hauskirchen, was elevated to the rank of Lord in the States of Upper Austria by Emperor Francis I. One of Isak's daughters, Katerina, married Simon-Georg Sina, a prominent merchant of Aromanian origin. The latter generation of the family moved away from trade to managing their estates in Austria and Hungary, which led to a decline in their fortunes. Some members married into prominent Orthodox families, including the Barons Duka of Kadar, the Dadany of Gyulvesz and the Ratz von Ehrenstädten, all of whom held estates in southern Hungary and had been ennobled at the end of the 18th century. The Gyra family became extinct around the time of World War I, though they remained active on the Board of Directors of the Orthodox Church in Vienna until then. Blazon: Quartered. At 1° sinople with an annulet Argent, at 2° Azure with a sheaf of wheat, Or: at 3° Azure with a house and a church au naturel resting on a terrace of sinople; at 4° Or, with a sailing ship sailing on an Azure sea. Two crests: 1 as for the coat of arms of 1792 and 2, the sheaf of wheat. Lambrequins of sinople and Argent and of Azure and Or.
	Coat of arms of Karl von Ghega (1851); Karl Ritter von Ghega was a railway engineer, known for having designed the first standard-gauge mountain railway in Europe. He was born in Venice to Anton Ghega, a maritime officer of Albanian descent and Anna Pribis. In his youth, Karl intended to follow in his father's footsteps and pursue a career in the naval forces. However, a passion for mathematics led him to study engineering at the University of Padua. Having completed military school, he earned a doctorate in mathematics at age 17. Between 1836 and 1840, Ghega oversaw the construction of the railway linking Vienna and Brno, known as the Kaiser Ferdinand Nordbahn. In 1844, he devised a plan to construct a railway across the Semmering Pass, connecting Gloggnitz with Mürzzuschlag — an ambitious project that culminated in the completion of the Semmering Railway (Semmeringbahn) in 1854, a groundbreaking achievement in railway engineering, now a UNESCO World Heritage Site. From 1853 to 1854, Ghega developed a comprehensive railway transport network for the entire Austrian Empire. He was later tasked with designing the railway system for Transylvania, but this work remained unfinished due to his untimely death from tuberculosis in 1860. In recognition of his contributions, Karl von Ghega was ennobled in 1851, receiving the title "Knight of Ghega", accompanied with a coat of arms. Blazon: Azure, upon a mound Or, a tree Vert, its trunk entwined with a chain Sable and perched upon a branch to dexter, a raven Sable.

=== Moldavia & Romania ===
Coat of arms
Description
Coat of arms of Vasile Lupu (1643)
The coat of arms of the Voivode of Moldavia is found in the 1643 publication titled "Carte de Învățătură" (p. 138), commissioned in Iași by Prince Vasile Lupu of Moldavia, himself of Albanian stock.

The rich decorative elements bear the distinctive mark of the engraver lita:

Blazon: Above the shield, a princely crown Or, jewelled and surmounted by a cross, supporting in saltire a sword and a scepter of the same. The escutcheon, ensigned with a fleur-de-lis, is charged with a bison’s head affronté Proper, crowned Or and bearing upon the forehead a mullet of six points of the same. In dexter chief, a sun in splendour Or; in sinister chief, a crescent affronté Argent. Surrounding the composition, Cyrillic letters Proper.

Prince Vasile Lupu traces his roots to the lesser-known Coci family, who had settled in Wallachia in the early 16th century, having migrated there from the Albanian settlement of Arbanasi, according to some sources.

The coat of arms is accompanied by the following poem:

STIHURI ÎN STEMA DOMNIEI MOLDOVEI

Deșì vedi cănd-va sămnú groznicú,
să nu te miri căndú să arata putérnicú.
Că putérniculú putérǐa-lú închipuǐaște,
și slăvitulú podoaba-lú schizméște.

Translation:
VERSES ON THE COAT OF ARMS OF MOLDAVIA

Though the ominous saddle comes into view,
don't be taken aback by its imposing stance.
For it appears as the embodiment of potent strength,
while the adorned embellishment sets it asunder.

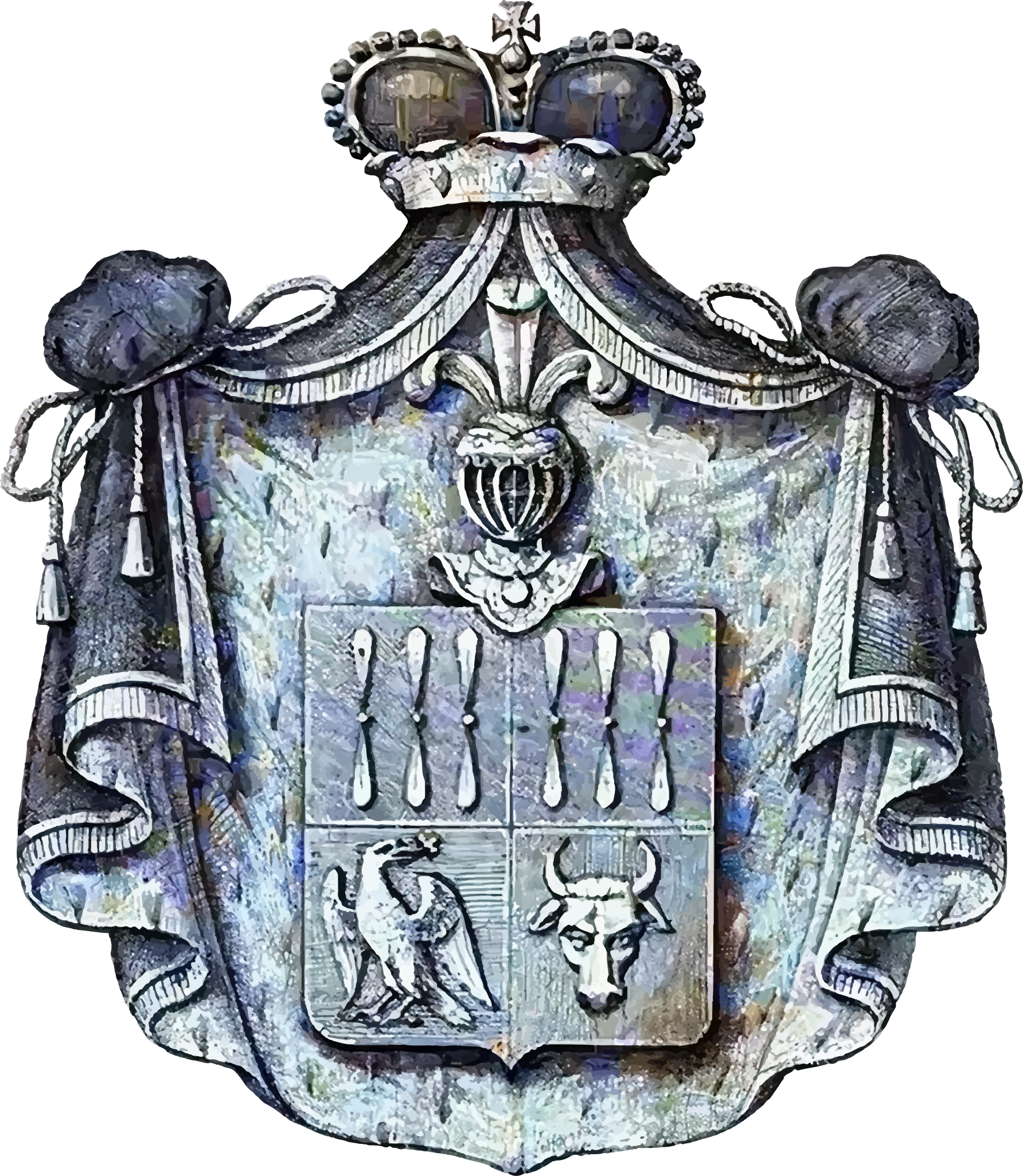
Coat of arms of the Ghica (1873)
The Ghica family is one of Romania's oldest noble families whose members were active in Wallachia, Moldavia and the Kingdom of Romania from the 17th century through the late 19th century. Of esteemed Albanian lineage, the family produced 9 princes, 2 prime ministers and other prominent figures in the world of politics and literature.

A noteworthy member of this family, influential writer and feminist Elena Ghica (pen name: Dora d'Istria) emblematized the Albanian national cause during the Renaissance period. Another family scion, Albert Ghica, a pretender to the Albanian throne, garnered recognition for his involvement during the Congress of Trieste and for providing monetary support to the Albanian Colony of Bucharest.

The quartered shield of their coat of arms was likely adopted during the reign of Alexandru II Ghica:

Blazon: A shield ensigned with a princely crown Or, jewelled and topped with a cross, surmounted by a barred helm affronté, crowned of the same. The helm is draped with a mantle doubled and tasseled, fastened with cords. The shield is parted per fess: in chief, upon a field, six gouttes in pale; in base, per pale, dexter an eagle displayed regardant [tincture], sinister a bison’s head affronté, both Proper.

The coat of arms shown here is a reproduction from a lithograph found in the 1873 book "Gli Albanesi in Rumenia", which chronicles the history of the Ghica family. A later variant of the coat of arms is portrayed in a painting by George Demetrescu Mirea.

=== Epirus & Morea ===
Coat of arms	Description
	Coat of arms of the Boccali (1453); The Boccali family of stratioti engaged in military and political pursuits within the Peloponnese during the years 1200–1216. Notable among their ranks was the Grand Duke Teodor Boccali (1453–1454), who commanded the Arvanites in the area. An illustration of their coat of arms is first encountered alongside that of the Kastrioti in Du Cange's 1680 publication "Historia Byzantina duplici commentario illustrata: Prior familias ... Imperatorum Constantinopol. ... complectitur alter descriptionem urbis Constantinopolis", and later featured in a work by Giffart in 1729. Du Cange, in his other work, titled "Illyricvm Vetvs & Novum Sive Historia", gives a brief profile of the Boccali family: BOCCALIORUM FAMILIA; We shall describe here the noble family of the Boccalii in Albania, because from them came Constantinus Boccalus, or Boccali, who was given by Francis I., King of the Franks, to serve the military of St. Michaelis. Nicolaus Boccalius, the father of this man, was driven out by the Turks, who were his dissidents and with his whole family, condescended to the Veneti, in whose armies he served for a long time. He married Catharinam, the sister of Arianitæ Comneni. Constantinius Boccalius received the parson of Comnenus, Captain General of the Holy See. A colored variation of the coat of arms is found in an 18th-century manuscript armorial, associated with Innocenzo Giacomelli. Blazon: Azure, two lions rampant affronté Or grasping the hilt of a sword palewise Argent; in chief two crowns Or.
	Coat of arms of the Barbati (1880); The Barbati family name appears in the 1576 monumental work titled "Della Osservanza Militare del Capitan Francesco Ferretti d'Ancona Cavallier Dell'Ordine di San Stefano", where a so-called Albanian, Agostin Barbati, is mentioned as the leggeri captain of Antivari. In 1883, the Barbati are referenced in De Rada's publication Fiàmuri Arbërit among a list of Albanian families. As far as we know from our forefathers, the Albanians who later built Piana de' Albanesi in Sicilia, moved there from Scutari. Those fiefdoms at that time belonged to the Archdiocese of Monreale – and for all Janni Barbati, Pietro Bua, Giorgio Gulemi, Janni Skiro, Jaani Macca. Later we find the Barbati family name recorded in a catalog of coats of arms, having served as Stratioti in Parga, at the time under Venetian rule. From the chronicles of Archduke Ludwig Salvator, published in 1907, the city numbered over 90 Albanian speaking families. Blazon: Or, a knight in full armor proper, holding a spiked mace in his dexter hand, his sinister hand resting on his hip. Above the escutcheon, a noble coronet proper, indicative of high rank. Beneath, a scroll bearing the name 'BARBATI'. In his study Araldica Arbëreshë, Luigi Taibi suggests that the Barbati may have descended from the Gashi tribe, in the Highlands of Gjakova. The seaside village of Barbati, in southern Greece, is named after the noble Barbati family, who led a group of Peloponnesian refugees from Nafplio and Monemvasia to settle on Corfu's northeastern coast in 1571.
	Armorial of Mercurio Bua (1498–1550); The Bua were an ancient Albanian family whose name is mentioned in the early decades of the 14th century. Having taken refuge in Corfu, they were registered in the island's Golden Book of Nobility in 1490. A fragmentary genealogy of the family appears at the end of Chroniques gréco-romanes inédites ou peu connues by Karl Hopf. The medievalist Sathas, for his part, provides a brief history of this lineage, which carved out a short-lived sovereignty in Epirus, as it was vested with a kind of vice-regal authority over part of Thessaly. With Achelous as their stronghold, they retreated into the mountains, defying the authority of various Balkan rulers. The first Bua defeated Emperor Kantakouzenos and were among the earliest to oppose the Ottoman advance. Between 1358 and 1399, the year of his death, Gjin Bua Spata was the Despot of Angelokastron, Arta, Aetolia and Naupactus. His successor, Maurice, served as Despot of Arta from 1401 to 1418 and briefly as Despot of Ioannina in 1403, before being deposed by Count Carlo Tocco in 1418. Eirene, the daughter of Bua Spata and the Serbian princess Helena Preljubović, was first married to Esau de' Buondelmonti, Despot of Ioannina. After becoming widowed in 1403, she was given in marriage to Centurione Zaccaria, Prince of Morea, though he did not outlive her long. Her half-brother, Paolo Bua Spata, was an illegitimate heir, as was common in noble families at the time. In 1407, he served as Captain of Arta but later surrendered the city to the Venetians. During this turbulent period, the most renowned member of the Bua lineage emerged: the condottiere Mercurio Bua. Initially serving the French crown, he fought under the Duke of Bourbon in 1495 alongside Charles VIII's forces, most notably at the Battle of Fornovo. Chroniclers such as Guicciardini and Commynes praised his valor. Emperor Maximilian I employed him in Flanders against the Count of Egmont, ultimately elevating him to nobility within the Holy Roman Empire, granting him the title of Count, accompanied by a distinguished coat of arms. Blazon: Escutcheon per pale: dexter per fess, in chief Gules, a cross pattée Or between two mullets of six points Argent; in base, Vert, a hedgehog Proper on a mound, above wavy bars Azure and Argent. Sinister per quarter: 1°, Azure, an eagle displayed Or; 2°. Gules, a hand Proper issuing from a tree Vert, grasping a serpent entwined around the trunk; 3°, Azure, a pair of interlaced serpents Or. Above the shield, a barred helm affronté, mantled Gules and Argent, surmounted by a crest of a triple-headed hound (or lion) statant Or, issuing from a crowned torse of the same. The Bua of later times are less well-documented but remain notable in Greek history. In 1585, a Bua Grivas led a revolt against the Ottomans in Acarnania. The Grivas family, originating from Epirus and later playing a significant role in the Greek War of Independence, claimed descent from this figure. Pietro Bua, who led a delegation of noble fleets to the Venetian Senate in 1622, bore a slightly different coat of arms featuring a wreath of carnations, an armed right hand and a tower surmounted by an eagle. The initials P.B. were added beneath.
	Coat of arms of the Clada (1925); The Clada family is of Epirote origin, hailing from Himara. They appear to have settled in the Peloponnese in the 14th century, as early as 1362, when we find mentioned one Leo Clada, who had made a donation to a monastery in Laconia. His heir, Theodoro, entered the services of the Palaiologos. In recognition of his loyalty, he was granted lands in Bardounia, Mani, a region where the Arvanite presence remained strong at least until 1821. Theodoro's son, Korkodeilos, led a rebellion in response to the peace treaty of 1479 between the Venetian Republic and Mehmed II, which handed over large possessions of the Clada, stretching west from the plain of Elos, to the Ottoman Turks. Forced to abandon Mani, members of this family went on to defend Modon and Coron, the last two Venetian strongholds in Morea. After the fall of Modon in 1499, the Clada migrated to Cephalonia, where they received large fiefdoms. There, they served in the Venetian Stratioti companies on the island and in Dalmatia, always with the highest distinction. By 1593, the family was registered in the Golden Book of Cephalonian Nobility. In 1700, the Doge of Venice conferred upon them the title of Count in recognition of their numerous services to the State. Blazon: Per pale, Dexter: Sable, a dexter arm proper embowed issuant from the sinister side, holding a sprig of flowers Argent; Sinister: Or, a serpent Azure erect and ondoyant. Above the escutcheon, a comital coronet proper, indicative of noble rank.
	Coat of arms of the Dusmani (1925); During the 15th century, the noble Dusmani family wielded authority over the Polati Minor region and beyond. Marin Barleti in his work "De vita, moribus et rebus gestis Scander-begei, Lib. II", makes mention of a Leca Dusmani, an independent local ruler who united with Skanderbeg, Prince of Croia, in their fight against Sultan Murad II. Following the conquest of Albania by the Ottoman Turks, the Dusmani family appears to have taken refuge in Athens, of which, as we know, the indigenous population still identifies as Albanian today. Around the middle of the 17th century, we find a Georgio Dusmani as Primate of Athens, who in 1686 was sent as Ambassador by the Athenians to negotiate with Venetian Admiral, Morosini, in order to implore him to spare the city and to correct the indemnity that was to be paid to Venice. When the misfortunes of the war brought about the loss of the city, Georgio took refuge with his family and wealth, to Gastouni, in the Peloponnese. On 3 December 1701, Doge Alvise II Mocenigo of Venice signed a decree at the Ducal Palace, granting the title of Count to Dusman Dusmani and Giovanni Dusmani, the two sons of the late Knight Georgio Dusmani. This title, along with its associated rights, privileges and prerogatives, was conferred upon them and their legitimate male descendants in perpetuity. Dusman Dusmani distinguished himself at the battle of Lepanto in 1715. One of his sons, Francesco, was Ephor of Zante and his title of Count was confirmed in 1750. Another son, Spiridon, settled in Corfu and was registered in the Golden Book of Nobility with his two male heirs, in May 1779 as Foreign Nobles, i.e. The family coat of arms is depicted in the first edition of Eugène Rizo Rangabè's "Livre d'Or De La Noblesse Ionienne – Corfou" (p. 97): Blazon: Sable, two arms embowed armoured proper, the hands clasped in a grip, supporting a sword Argent in pale. Above the escutcheon, a comital coronet proper, indicative of noble rank.
	Coat of arms of the Blessa (1926); The Blessa family (Maléogu) is of Albanian origin. For centuries they served as feudal lords in the Peloponnese and as Stratioti in the service of Venice. When the Ottoman Turks captured the Venetian strongholds of Modon and Coron in 1501, the Blessa, along with other noble families, fled to Cephalonia. There, the Venetian government granted them fiefs as a reward for their service. Historian G. P. Loverdo writes: "As mentioned at the beginning of this chapter, several families from Modon and Coron settled in Cephalonia after these cities fell to the Ottomans. The Venetians employed them as Stratioti, mounted soldiers tasked with defending the island's coastline from frequent Turkish raids, which often resulted in the capture of inhabitants and the plundering of their possessions. The Venetian Lordship granted these Stradioti families stable assets, in addition to a sum of money, to sustain themselves and their horses. Among the families that originated from them and still exist on the island are the Blessas, along with others that have since become extinct." The coat of arms is describes as follows: Blazon: Sable, a tower Argent masoned Sable, with an arched gateway and two windows, surmounted by a cross patriarchal of the same; the whole enclosed by a fortified wall Argent masoned Sable. Above the escutcheon, a ducal coronet proper, signifying princely rank.
	Coat of arms of the Chielmi (1926); The noble Chielmi family traces its origins to Epirus, in Albania, before migrating to the Peloponnese, where they acquired fiefdoms in the province of Magne. Cosma Chielmi distinguished himself in 1479 during the defense of Magne, refusing to acknowledge the transfer of the province to Venice under the peace treaty signed that year by Sultan Mehmed II. Other members of this family excelled in various Venetian wars, serving in Nauplie, Lepanto, Dalmatia and beyond. In 1542, Lazzaro Chielmi, Captain of the Stratioti, was appointed Commander-in-Chief of the Venetian forces on the island of Cephalonia. He settled there permanently after marrying and receiving the village of Chielmata as a stronghold. In 1593, Lazzaro was inscribed in the Golden Book of Cephalonian Nobility and held a seat on the "Major Council" of the island's nobles. In the latter half of the 18th century, Nicolò Chielmi was appointed Admiral-Commander of the Black Sea Fleet, with the family's nobility recognized by a decree of Empress Catherine the Great. The Holy See granted him the right to fly the Vexillum of the Holy Land on his ship and this emblem was incorporated into the Chielmi family coat of arms: Blazon: Sable, a cross potent between four crosslets Purpure. Above the escutcheon, a ducal coronet proper, signifying princely rank. In modern times, the Chielmi became known primarily as long-term traders. The Center for Sicilian Philological and Linguistic Studies in its 3rd volume bulletin, published in 1955 explains the toponym of the Chielmi name as follows:...names under the surname of «Chelmi» or «Chielmi» from 1513 to 1564; currently there are many toponymic traces of this name: there is a Helmi in the district of Theth, one in Gallata of Kurbin and one in the district of Mendraka near Mollas, Elbasan; there are also three Helmas, near Tirana, Kavaja and in Malakastra and a Helmes near Vlusha of Skrapar...
	Coat of arms of the Calenzi (1927); The Calenzi were an Albanian family of stratioti whose members served in the Venetian army in Cyprus, during the 16th century. After the conquest of the island by the Ottoman Turks, the Calenzi took refuge in Zante (1670), where they obtained fiefdoms and were inscribed in the Golden Book of Nobility of the island, in 1735. Rangabè ambiguously describes them as a Byzantine family from Constantinople, even while acknowledging in the biographical passage of his work "Livre d'Or De La Noblesse Ionienne – Zante" the following: several villages inhabited by Albanians with the name Calenzi are found in Attica, Drimopolis and Zante (notary J. Sturion, 1516). This contradiction is further complicated by the author's failure to provide any sources supporting his claim of a Byzantine origin. French historian François Pouqueville considers the Calenzi to be of Albanian stock. Raffaele Patitucci, in his extract "Casati Albanesi in Calabria e Sicilia", published in 1989, notes that a branch of the Calenzi family settled in the Arbëreshë community of San Demetrio Corone. Blazon: Sable, a column Argent with an Ionic capital, issuing from a rocky base proper, surmounted by a six-pointed mullet of the second. Above the escutcheon, a ducal coronet proper, signifying princely rank.
	Coat of arms of the Combothecra (1926); The noble Combothecra family (Albanian: këmbëthekra, meaning fringe-footed) were prominent feudal lords from the village of the same name, which they sieged in Acarnania, as noted by Cicelli (Ke. Lou 6. 25). Since before 1336, they had become influential and wealthy landholders. By 1338, Martino Combothecra held the title Duke of Modon and was commander of the Byzantine forces stationed there. Around the 15th century, some members of the family emerged as powerful lords in the Peloponnese and served as Stratioti (mercenary soldiers) under the flag of Venetia, distinguishing themselves during the defense of Modon against the Ottoman Turks in 1499. After the fall of the city, the Combothecra migrated to Cephalonia, where they were granted pensions and large estates, while continuing to serve in the Venetian military, consequently earning great distinction in various conflicts throughout the 16th century. In 1593, the family was inscribed in the Golden Book of Nobility, with several members serving on the island's Major Council. Later we find them as navigators and captains of the sea. Blazon: Sable, a dexter arm proper issuant from a sea Azure, holding aloft a cross pattée Argent. Above the escutcheon, a ducal coronet proper, signifying princely rank.

=== Ottoman Empire ===
==== Grand viziers ====
Coat of arms	Description
	Coat of arms of Koca Sinan Pasha (1596); Koca Sinan Pasha was an Ottoman-Albanian military figure and statesman who served for five terms as Grand Vizier of the Ottoman Empire. Appointed governor of the Egypt Eyalet in 1569, he was subsequently involved in the conquest of Yemen two years later, becoming known as Fātiḥ-i Yemen ("Conqueror of Yemen"). In 1594, he ordered the burning of Saint Sava's relics on the Vračar plateau. Contemporary Turkish historians note that he remained close to his heritage and would give those of Albanian stock preference to high-level positions within the empire. The coat of arms attributed to his namesake can be found in the engraving work by Giacomo Franco, published in Venetia in 1596 and currently on display at the Metropolitan Museum of Art in New York City. Blazon: Sable, five mullets Argent in lozenge, the central of eight points, the others of six. The escutcheon within an ornate cartouche proper, surmounted by a crescent Argent, symbolizing Islam.
	Coat of arms of Köprülüzade Fazıl Ahmed Pasha (1690); Köprülüzade Fazıl Ahmed Pasha was an Ottoman-Albanian nobleman and statesman, belonging to the renowned Köprülü family, which produced six Grand Viziers for the Ottoman Empire. He served in the post of Grand Vizier himself from 1661 to 1676, after inheriting the title from his father, Köprülü Mehmed Pasha. Köprülüzade Ahmed Pasha led the Ottoman Army in the Austro-Turkish War of 1663–64 and succeeded in destroying Novi Zrin in the northern part of the Kingdom of Croatia after nearly a month-long siege. Later on he would capture Candia (present-day Heraklion) from the Republic of Veneto in 1669, during the Cretan War. His coat of arms is depicted in the engraving work by Nicolas de Larmessin, dated from 1690 and published in the Gallica Digital Library. Blazon: Per fess: In chief, Argent, a crescent Sable; in base, Sable, a mountain proper.

=== Egypt ===
Coat of arms	Description
	Coat of arms of the Muhammad Ali dynasty (1867–1914); Muhammad Ali Pasha was an Ottoman-Albanian governor and the de facto ruler of Egypt from 1805 to 1848. The dynasty he established would go on to rule the country until the military coup of 1952. These arms were assumed during the reign of Khedive Ismail Pasha the Magnificent, when Egypt was elevated to a Khedivate. Blazon: A mantle Gules, fringed and tasseled Or, surmounted by a regal crown proper. The mantle is fastened with six tugs in saltire, denoting the rank of Khedive. Within, on a circular escutcheon Azure, a crescent Argent, emblematic of Islam, accompanied by three mullets of five points Argent, representing Egypt, Sudan and Nubia — constituent elements of the lesser coat of arms. The coat of arms took a slightly different form during subsequent periods of the reign. Altered once again towards the conclusion of Khedive Abbas Hilmi Il's rule, coinciding with Egypt's transition to a Sultanate. The final revision was implemented during King Fuad I's reign, when he proclaimed Egypt a kingdom on 15 March 1922.

== Modern period ==
Click on the [show] link to view content from the Coat of arms of the modern-day Albanian State

== State coats of arms ==
Coat of arms	Description
Great Arms Diplomatic Seal	Coat of arms of the Principality of Albania (1914); The earliest usage of state symbols is prescribed in the Organic Statute of Albania, drafted by the International Commission of Control. Chapter II, titled "The sovereign", in articles 7 and 18 states: § The sovereign Art 7. The throne of the Albanian Principality is hereditary in the Family of Prince Gaillaume of Wied. Art 18. He has the right to have his graven image or his arms appear on the coins, medals and stamps of the State as well as on any piece or object representing governmental power. The official newspaper of the Albanian government, Perlindja e Shqipëniës, in its opening page article titled "Speech of the King's in-law – Royal Court – Crown of Albania", dated 28 February 1914, gives an elaborate depiction of the coat of arms: The crown of Albania, made of gold and lined with silk, has ten peaks. The middle peak, which is shorter than the others, bears the five-pointed star of Albania. The mantle of the Regent is most rich. Made of red, purple cloth, the lining of this cloak is of ermine and in the center it has the double-headed eagle of Albania with a red tongue and four lightning bolts between its claws. Additionally, a shield with the arms of the Wied family has been added to the eagle: the peacock on a golden field, turned to red and black, our national colors. On the overlay that is in the mouth of the cloak is embroidered in gold the Wied family motto "Fidelitate e Veritate", which means Loyalty and Truth. An illustration of the coat of arms was published for the first time in an article by Eberhard Freiherr von Wechmar in the weekly illustrated newspaper Die Woche (1914), issue no. 10, p. 387. The extract from german reads: "A golden-armed, red-tongued black double-headed eagle with bundles of four golden thunderbolts in each fang, on the chest covered with a black-red embroidered shield bordered in gold, a wheeling natural-colored peacock, in frontal position, the whole under an ermine-lined golden-fringed purple mantle, which falls from the Albanian princely crown. Blue banner with Wied's motto "FIDELITATE ET VERITATE" in golden letters". The coat of arms is once more featured in the form of a diplomatic seal on a royal invitation letter addressed to captain N. Thomson, the brother of Lt. Colonel L.W.Thomson. It bears the prince's coat of arms and that of the family of princess Sophie, both under the Albanian crown.
Gold model Silver model	Coat of arms of the Albanian Republic (1926–1929); The Coat of Arms of the Albanian Republic was introduced by decree-law "On the state coats of arms and official flags", dated 12 July 1926: We, the President of the Albanian Republic, vested by the will of the people with the sovereign powers of the state; DECREE: Art. 1 The coat of arms of the state is the black Eagle with two heads, with a red layer on the eagle's chest. The Helm of Skanderbeg (in gold) surrounded by arms and banners. Four-sided coat of arms according to the sample. Art. 5 This decree-law enters into force from the day of its promulgation. A. Zogu d.v. Co-signed: Hysein Vrioni (Minister of Foreign Affairs), Sulejman Starova (Minister of Finances) and Musa Juka (Minister of Public Works and Agriculture). Teki Selenica's encyclopedic guide book Shqipria më 1927, e illustruar (p. 125) provides an illustration of the coat of arms whereby the helm with the arms and banners is displayed in silver profile. The usage of the silver model is reaffirmed in official documents of the Ministry of Internal Affairs' secret office from the late fall of 1929.
	Coat of arms of the Albanian Kingdom (1929–1939); A decree-law in reference to the new Coat of Arms of the State was published in Fletorja Zyrtare, dated 14 August 1929 (p. 7–8). The redaction is from the original print using a form of old gheg, conventional for the time: § Coat of arms of the State Art. 2 The coat of arms consists of: a) a mantle, with a crown on top b) a shield, in the center with a double-headed eagle Art. 3 The mantle is represented by a close toned red velvet fabric, placed symmetrically in a fold, slightly raised on the sides and tightened by two ribbons knotted together. The mantle features gold-washed leaves and is layered with white ermine leather with small gold endings. The mantle rises in the center and above it is the crown of Skanderbeg in lead and gold. Art. 4 The shield placed in the center of the mantle bears the double-headed Albanian eagle (with raised wings and divided into 9 feathers for each wing) placed on a red and gold field. Art. 5 The forms of the coat of arms with all the details specified in the previous articles 3 and 4 are shown in the attached model. § Use of the Coat of arms Art. 18 State offices are obliged to place the State Coat of Arms on official documents, signs, seals and any other official item. The coat of arms in question is reproduced: a) on sign boards with all its colors b) on stamps, documents and all other items only in black, smooth or in relief and in small form. On the proposal of the Ministerial Council, no. 1272, dated 5 August 1929 DECREES: The approval and implementation of the Decree-law on the Coat of Arms and Flags of the State. Tirana, 8 August 1929. ZOG d. v.
Great Arms Lesser Arms	Great/lesser arms of the Kingdom of Albania (1939–1943); On 3 June 1939, his Majesty the King Emperor, surrounded by his civil and military entourage, placed the «Constitutional Charter» into the hands of the President of the Ministerial Council, Vërlaci, expressing the paternal solicitude and affection for the Albanian people which inspired his determination. The said "Charter", made up of 54 articles grouped into 7 Titles, makes no mention yet of a coat of arms. The arms of the Kingdom of Albania were promulgated by royal decree nr. 141, dated 28 September 1939. Summarized in seven article paragraphs, they are described as follows: "The Greater arms of State is formed by a shield (scudo), red in color and with the black two headed eagle crowned by Skanderbeg's helm. Bearings: two Lictor fasces supported by axes pointing outwards, bound by leather straps, attached above by the Savoy knots, below by a scroll ribbon, of light blue color, gilded, charged with the word FERT, repeated three times. And the whole placed on a layer of red silk surrounded by fringes, woven of gold, decorated with ermine, crested by the Royal Crown of Savoy." The greater arms is used: in the great seal of the State, on solemn occasions and in monumental decorations. "The Lesser arms of State is formed by a shield (scudo), red in color and with the black two headed eagle crowned by Skanderbeg's helm. Bearings: two Lictor fasces supported by axes pointing outwards, bound by leather straps, attached above by the Savoy knots, below by a scroll ribbon, of light blue color, gilded, charged with the word "Fert", repeated three times. The shield is crested by the Royal Crown of Savoy." The lesser arms is used by the state administration.
	State emblem of Communist Albania (1946–1992); Article 95 of the Statute of the People's Republic of Albania (1946) describes the state emblem as follows: "The national emblem of the People's Republic of Albania represents a field wrapped by two sheaves of ears of wheat. The sheaf of wheat is bound at the lower end with a ribbon which bears the inscription of the date 24 Maj 1944. A five-pointed red star stands among the tops of the tufts of the ears of wheat. A black double-headed eagle stands in the center of the field." Article 107 of the Constitution of the People's Socialist Republic of Albania (1976) maintains the same design phraseology as its precursor although expressed in a whole condensed sentence: "The emblem of the People's Socialist Republic of Albania bears a black, double-headed eagle, encircled by two sheaves of wheat with a five-pointed red star at the top and tied at the bottom with a red ribbon, on which the date »24 Maj 1944« is inscribed." Designed by acclaimed painter Sadik Kaceli, the emblem was initially adopted on 14 March 1946. It was readopted with minor amendments on 28 December 1976. The shapes of the emblem have undergone several changes over the decades. The officially accepted model, which has been used in banknotes and fiscal stamps since 1947, was published by the political and informative review "Albania today", in its 1st issue (32) of the 7th annual edition (1977).
	Coat of arms of the Republic of Albania (1992–1998); On 7 April 1992, the Assembly formed after the early elections, in its afternoon session, voted to remove the communist emblem as the official symbol of the state including the removal of the star from the country's flag and established a parliamentary commission tasked with studying the proposal of a new emblem of the state. During the plenary session of 13 November 1992, under proposal was the amendment of law no. 7491, dated 25.04.1991, "On the Main Constitutional Provisions" which propagated the inclusion of a new chapter titled "Flag, Coat of Arms and The Capital". Article 3 of the chapter, as read by the secretary of the assembly, stated the following: "The coat of arms of the Republic of Albania displays a black double-headed eagle placed on an escutcheon, a varriated type shield in red color. The shield is to have a straight line on top, that comes narrowing at the bottom. On top of the shield are written the words: Republika e Shqipërisë". — Law no. 7491, dated 25.04.1991, Article 3: "§ Flag, Coat of Arms and The Capital" After several discussions and with no objections, the chairman of the assembly Pjetër Arbnori took the microphone to announce that article 3 was approved unanimously. The image of the coat of arms is found in various documents of the state archive and was once suspended at the main curtain wall in front of the rostrum of the national assembly.

== National defence ==
=== Military coats of arms ===
Defence Ministry

Armed Forces

Land Force

Naval Force

Air Force

General Staff
Support Command

Regional Support Brigade

Training and Doctrine Command

Military Intelligence

Military Police

Military Hospital

=== Police coats of arms ===
State Police

Order Police

Border & Migration Police

Road Police
Rapid Intervention Force

Shqiponjat

RENEA

== Local administration ==
=== Counties ===
The symbolism in the coats of arms of counties in Albania is reflected in Article 5 of Law no. 139/2015, later amended by Law no. 38/2019, dated 20 June 2019 and titled "On Local Self-Governance", which classifies the county as a second level unit of local governance that represents an administrative-territorial unit, consisting of several municipalities with geographic, economic, social and common interests.

Berat

Dibër

Durrës

Elbasan

Fier

Gjirokastër
Korçë

Kukës

Lezhë

Shkodër

Tiranë

Vlorë

=== Municipalities ===
Emblems of municipalities are required to incorporate and visually present, in a highly stylized approach and preferably in accordance with the formal rules of heraldry, the inherent elements and distinctive features that typify and symbolize any given municipality.

Belsh

Berat

Bulqizë

Cërrik

Delvinë

Devoll

Dibër
Dimal

Divjakë

Dropull

Durrës

Elbasan

Fier

Finiq
Fushë-Arrëz

Gjirokastër

Gramsh

Has

Himarë

Kamëz

Kavajë
Këlcyrë

Klos

Kolonjë

Konispol

Korçë

Krujë

Kuçovë
Kukës

Kurbin

Lezhë

Libohovë

Librazhd

Lushnjë

Malësi e Madhe
Maliq

Mallakastër

Mat

Memaliaj

Mirditë

Patos

Peqin
Përmet

Pogradec

Poliçan

Prrenjas

Pukë

Pustec

Roskovec
Rrogozhinë

Sarandë

Selenicë

Shijak

Shkodër

Skrapar

Tepelenë
Tirana

Tropojë

Vau i Dejës

Vlorë

Vorë

== Ecclesiastical symbols ==
=== Coats of arms ===
Coat of arms	Description
	Coat of arms of Georgio Lapazaia (1575) Georgio Lapazaia was an apostolic prothonotary, mathematician and musician of Albanian stock, offspring of Danush and Maruccia, who arrived in Monopoli from Durazzo after the fall of Constantinople. In 1508, he attained the title of sub-diaconate, eventually becoming Canon of the Monopoli Cathedral. Culturally versed in the Quadrivium, in 1532, Lapazaia composed an Antiphonary of processional nature, blending Gregorian chants with his own monophonic compositions. In 1542, he published a seminal treatise on Arithmetic and Geometry that saw numerous reprints until the late 18th century. Lapazaia's coat of arms is artistically depicted in several of his works, as part of a larger frontispiece ensemble: Blazon: Argent, a bridge of three arches proper spanning a river in base, in chief an estoile of eight points Or. The shield ensigned with a galero Sable, adorned with six tassels on either side in three rows (1, 2, 3). Above the escutcheon, an oval medallion bearing the effigy of a vested and capped bearded figure, surrounded by an inscription reading "Giorgio Lapazaia Protonotaro Apostolico." The whole within an ornamental cartouche and surmounted by a coronet Or.
	Coat of arms of Pjetër Bogdani (1685); Pjetër Bogdani is the most prominent writer of early Albanian literature. Born in the village of Gur, in the northern Has region, he was ordained archbishop of Scupi in 1677. Bogdani is the author of Cuneus Prophetarum, published in Padua in 1685, considered the first prose work of substance written originally in Gheg. It features a frontispiece showing the image of himself kneeling down for a prayer, next to an altar with an episcopal coat of arms. Blazon: Sable, a bend embattled Argent; in chief, an estoile of eight points Or; in base, upon a mount of three hillocks Vert, a rose Gules; the whole within a shield, ensigned with a galero Sable, cords held by two winged cherubs proper supporting the cartouche, adorned with six tassels on each side arranged in three rows (1, 2, 3). Above the shield, a cross pattée Or.
	Coat of arms of Giovanni Francesco Albani (1689); The defining elements in the coat of arms of Pope Clement XI are found in a rare 1689 Cantelli da Vignola map of Albania, which incorporates most of present-day Montenegro and part of North Macedonia. The modern capital of Tirana appears as Terrana. Engraved in Roma by Giorgio Widman and printed for inclusion in De Rossi's "Mercurio Geografico", the copperplate features neatly hachured coastlines, pictorially represented mountains and forests, with clear and elegant typography. In the upper right corner is shown a dedicatory cartouche to Papal official Giovanni Francesco Albani who in 1700 would become Pope Clement XI. Originating from Albania, as the family name suggests, the Albani wielded significant authority and influence within the Church. Blazon: Argent, a fess Sable, in chief a mullet of six points of the second, in base a mount of three peaks proper; within a cartouche-shaped escutcheon. Ensigned with a galero Sable, from which hang tassellated cords pendant on each side, proper to ecclesiastical rank. The whole suspended from a lance, attached to a mantling, bearing the following inscription: Albania, which two centuries ago mourned the departure of its most famous sons, Heroes who had defended it against the Barbarians until then, will now... be partly consoled by remembering that among those famous Warriors, were Filippo and Giorgio of the noble Lazii family... they were called Albani, from the provinces of which they had come and then transmitted this new surname to their Illustrious posterity among whom shines so brightly in our Lazio...
	Coat of arms of the Arbëresh Seminary of Palermo (1757); The Arbëresh community's transformation and self-awareness began with the establishment of two educational institutions: the Corsini College (1732) in San Benedetto Ullano, Calabria, supported by the Rodotà brothers and the Arbëresh Seminary of Palermo (1734), in Sicilia, founded on the initiative of Father Giorgio Guzzetta. These two institutions, representing the main centers for theological thought, favored the development of a strong national consciousness among the Arbëresh intellectual circles. Their objective was to distinguish the Arbëresh community of the Byzantine rite from the Greeks, embracing instead an "Italo-Albanian" character, thus dispelling any falsehoods of their ethno-religious identity. The Arbëresh Seminary of Palermo, under the guidance of Father Guzzetta, set up the first ideological laboratory for exploring their Albanian national past, within an Arbëresh context. Its activities were further elaborated by Guzzetta's successors, Paolo Parrino and Nicola Chetta. The coat of arms is found on the cover page of the 1757 work titled "Regole del Seminario italo-greco albanese di Palermo approvate dalla santità di nostro signore papa Benedetto XIV", published by the Sacra Congregatio de Propaganda Fide. Blazon: Arms: Cartouche-shaped escutcheon, Argent, a heart proper. Crest: A crowned helm adorned with acanthus leaves and scrollwork. Supporters: To dexter, a palm frond proper; to sinister, an olive branch proper. Motto: A scroll beneath the shield, bearing an abstruse inscription in Latin.
	Coat of arms of the Xaverian College (1877); Facing the hardships and obstacles of antireligious fanaticism and attacks on local clergy, on October 17, 1877, in the presence of the old archbishop Pooten and Father Zef Lombardini, a new institution named the "Xaverian College of Jesuits" opened its doors in the city of Shkodër. Blazon: A bicephalous eagle displayed Sable, beaked and membered Or, each head surmounted by a scroll bearing the motto "PER ATME" – "PER ZÓT" – "E PERPARIM." Upon its breast, an escutcheon tierced per pale: in dexter, a radiant sun bearing the monogram "IHS" Argent on a field Or; in sinister, an image of a saint, Francis Xavier, proper on a field Argent; in base, a castle with an arched entrance proper on a field Argent.

=== Seals ===
Seal	Description
	Seal of the Albanian Franciscan Administration (1585); Following Skanderbeg's passing in 1468 and the subsequent Ottoman occupation of his domains, many Franciscan monasteries were destroyed or damaged. In response, a special administration with extensive powers was promptly established by Franciscan Superior General Francis Gonzaga, in 1585. The administration or commissariat was thirty-first in line of establishment and fell under the direct jurisdiction of the Superior General. Its five monasteries at Sebasta, Lezhë, Rubik, Memli and Kep Redoni housed over forty Franciscan monks. In 1488, Pope Innocent VIII had turned St. Mary's Benedictine monastery at Kep Redoni (Caporedoni) over to the Franciscan's Dalmatian Province. The monastery later became the center of the Albanian Franciscan Province from 1713 to 1727. The Albanian Franciscan Administration possessed its own seal, still preserved today. Blazon: A vesica-shaped ecclesiastical seal, party per fess. In chief, a nimbed figure kneeling in prayer proper, vested in monastic robes, hands raised in supplication. Before the figure, a lectern supporting an open book and above, a scroll inscribed ‘AGP’ Sable. From dexter chief, a dove volant downward proper, emitting a ray from its beak. In base, within a smaller compartment, a bishop affronté proper, mitred, holding a crosier in his sinister hand. The whole within a bordure inscribed ‘SIGILLVM COMMISSARII PROVINCIE MACEDONIE ORDINISMINO REGVLA OBSERVACE’ in Gothic script Sable.
	Seal of Nikoll Mekajshi (1592); Possibly descending from the settlement of Mjekës, present-day Elbasan, Nikoll Mekajshi was ordained bishop of Stefania and Benda in 1592. He played a pivotal role in the uprising of 1595, aimed to attack and liberate Croya from the Ottomans. From 1601 to 1602, Mekajshi participated as a leading figure at the Convention of Dukagjin. The Kingdom of Spain recognized him as ambassador of the Albanian clansmen (1602–1615). His Episcopal seal is preserved in the collection of Shtjefën Gjeçovi, borrowed for publication from Theodor Ippen, the Austrian consul in Shkodër, who had published it in his monograph in Vienna. Blazon: An ecclesiastical seal bearing an escutcheon within an ornate cartouche, ensigned with a mitre proper, its infulae descending. Within the escutcheon, a dexter arm embowed proper issuant from the sinister flank, grasping a crosier Or with a trefoil head. To dexter of the crosier, a dove close regardant proper and to sinister, a dexter hand proper raised in benediction. The whole encircled by a bordure inscribed ‘SIG•FR•NICOLAI•MECA•EPS•STEPHA•ET•BE’ Sable.

== In society ==
Coat of arms	Description
	Thallóczy's coat of arms (1897); A color illustration featuring Albanian heraldic motifs, sketched according to the original conception of its author, Ludwig von Thallóczy, whose vision was for the national coat of arms which he had specifically designed for Albania, be included in its political future. Thallóczy himself amalgamated traditional Albanian elements like the eagle, the wolf and the red and black colors with prevailing oriental religious symbols of the era, such as the crescent moon and the horse's tail, symbols of the Ottoman Empire, uniformly embraced by the nominal Muslim majority of Albanians. Ultimately, the Austro-Hungarian foreign ministry objected to its publication due to concerns about the potential impact it would have on its political interests in the region, which was to maintain the current status quo. Blazon: Per pale: Gules, a bicephalous eagle displayed Or, in chief a mullet of eight points Azure; and Sable, a colt rampant contourny proper, in chief a crescent Gules. The shield ensigned with a royal crown proper.
	Coat of arms of Aladro Kastriota (????); Juan Pedro Aladro Kastriota (1845–1914) was a Basque diplomat, politician and bibliophile with a long established career in European diplomacy. Born in Jerez de la Frontera on May 8, 1845, Aladro pursued studies in humanities at the Provincial Institute (now Padre Luis Coloma) and the San Felipe Neri private school in Cádiz, before enrolling to law school in Seville. In 1867, he embarked on a diplomatic career, securing a position at the Spanish Ministry of State. Over the years, he was stationed in embassies across various European countries, where he distinguished himself as a cultured and multilingual dignitary, fluent in French, German, English, Italian, Spanish, Russian, Albanian and Basque — the latter of whom he had special affection and veneration. A great traveler and patron of the arts, Aladro amassed a large collection of over 13,000 volumes in his library. His palace in Jerez — now the Domecq Palace, inherited from his father after its acquisition in the Mendizábal confiscations — housed a prized museum featuring a wide array of artworks. Aladro also played a notable role in Albanian history. Preceding Albania's independence from the Ottoman Empire, he sought to claim the Albanian throne, asserting his descent through the maternal line from one Princess Kastriota, a supposed descendant of the national hero Gjergj Kastrioti Skanderbeg. His coat of arms, featuring a portrait of himself and that of his wife, presides on the front end bookplate of the 1858 work by Gustave Vapereau, titled "Dictionnaire Universel des Contemporains Contenant Toutes les Personnes...". Arms: Quartered: 1°, Or, an inescutcheon Gules, charged with a lion rampant Purpure, armed and langued Gules, surmounted by a royal crown Or; 2°, Gules, a bicephalous eagle displayed Sable, crowned of the same; 3°, a depiction of a noble lady, proper (Aladro's wife); 4°, a depiction of a gentleman in military attire, proper (representing Juan Pedro Aladro Kastriota). Crest: Upon the shield, a crowned helm Or, surmounted by a radiant eight-pointed star Argent, emitting rays Or. Mantling: Purpure, lined Ermine, fastened with tasseled cords Or, ensigned with a princely crown.
	Coat of arms of the Tedeschini (????); The prominent Tedeschini family traces its roots to the Abruzzo region of Italy. The first known ancestor to settle in Albania, Emidio Tedeschini, wrote in 1766 that he was born in the city of Vasto, then part of the Kingdom of Naples, a territory contested at the time by the Habsburg and Bourbon dynasties. A physician by profession, he arrived in Scutari around 1760 and served as court physician to Mehmet Pasha Bushatlliu. Political tensions prompted his relocation to Durazzo, where he continued practicing medicine and later served as vice-consul at the Venetian consulate. In 1770, he married Paulina Kabashi. Giuseppe, a diplomat and philanthropist, entered the Austrian diplomatic service and from 1814 onward, served as Consul General for Albania. Francesco, a pharmacist by profession, was involved in the exportation of salt to Sicilia. He commissioned the construction of the family’s main residence and that of St. Lucia's catholic church, later marrying Rosa Kamsi with whom he shared five children. Francesco II married Justina Ashiku. Both tragically died in 1915 during a wave of epidemics, leaving behind two surviving sons: Giuseppe III and Emidio II. Orphaned at a young age, Emidio II was raised in Vienna, where he distinguished himself academically. He earned a doctorate in law from LMU Munich and later translated the Civic (1939) and Commercial (1941) Codes of the Albanian Kingdom into Italian. One of his major achievements was the codification of the Kanun of Lekë Dukagjini (1944), in collaboration with Father Benedikt Dema, previously understood only through oral tradition. In 1955, Emidio II compiled the first English–Albanian dictionary with 25,000 words. Blazon: An oval escutcheon Sable, a tree eradicated proper entwined by a serpent nowed Argent; surmounted by a coronet Or. To dexter, a winged beast rampant of the same, supporting the escutcheon. To sinister, a dexter arm embowed, vested, sustaining a banner displayed. In base, the serpent’s tail extended and entwined.
	Konica's coat of arms (1905); The front page of the biweekly periodical Albania, published in Brussels by Faik Konica since 1896, features an illustration of a double-headed eagle, cradling a flame torch between its heads. A ribbon encircles the torch's handle, bearing the word "UNITAS" (meaning Oneness), symbolizing a call for unity among Albanians. The eagle's chest is shielded and in the upper left corner hangs a black cross. A waving stripe stretches across the shield, wraps around the body and ends on both sides of the eagle's neck, allowing its wings to remain partly unfurled. The text "ALBANIA" is prominently displayed. On the left side of the ribbon, it reads "ANNO" and on the right, "1896". Two claws grasp a lower ribbon, forming an arch, inscribed with the Latin text "UNGUIBUS ET ROSTRIS", meaning "Claws and Beaks". This graphic work of art was conceived by Belgian painter Paul Nocquet, under the guidance of Konica himself. Blazon: Sable, a bicephalous eagle displayed Or, charged on the breast with an escutcheon Argent bearing a cross potent Sable. Above, a ducal coronet Or issuant therefrom flames proper. About the eagle’s neck, a scroll Argent inscribed ‘ANNO 1368’ Sable. Over the escutcheon, a ribbon Argent inscribed ‘ALBANIA’ Sable. In base, a scroll Argent fimbriated and inscribed ‘UNGVIBUS ET ROSTRIS’ Sable.
	Coat of arms of the Patriotic Club of Ioannina and Delvina (1909); In 1909, the Albanians of Ioannina and Delvina founded a patriotic club that quickly emerged as a center of national thought and a strong advocate for Albania’s self-rule. From its printing presses came pamphlets such as Albanian Brothers and Self-Government of Albania, calling for the unification of the four Albanian Vilayets, the cultural awakening of the nation, education in the Albanian language and the solidarity of Muslims and Christians in the struggle for freedom. Their motto, carved upon a black-shield emblem, proclaimed with quiet resolve: “For ourselves – not for the outsiders” Blazon: Argent, a bend sable; within a bordure engrailed Or.
	Coat of arms of the Bogdani Society (1920); Among the cultural-artistic societies that emerged in the city of Shkodër during the post-independence years, the "Bogdani" society held a prominent place. Established by a group of young men who departed from the "Oratory of the Heart of Christ" to form their own organization, naming it after and being inspired by the patriotic ideals of Pjetër Bogdani, a renowned writer of old Albanian literature. In their programmatic document dated 27 May 1920, the society expressed its commitment "...out of love for the flourishing of the Albanian nation...". Its coat of arms bore the motto "Working for our Fatherland". Blazon: Sable, upon an escutcheon Argent a mountainous landscape Proper beneath a sun in splendour, its rays descending. The escutcheon is encompassed by a ribbon Argent inscribed in letters Sable "PER ATDHÉ TË PUNOJMË" Above all, a coronet Or embattled and adorned with pearls. To dexter chief, a quill and inkwell Proper; to sinister chief, a lyre Proper; in base to dexter, a helmet and sword Proper with an olive branch; in base to sinister, a trefoil Or with foliage Proper. Interestingly, the same coat of arms was adopted by the parish and members of the "Rozafat" society for various activities, including theatrical performances, carnival celebrations and musical events."

== See also ==
- Albanian heraldry
- Coat of arms of Albania
- Armorial of sovereign states
