= Flag of Albania =

Republic of Albania
- Use: National flag
- Proportion: 5:7 (1:1.4)
- Adopted: 1443; 583 years ago 1912; 114 years ago (general scheme); 10 January 1946; 80 years ago (star added); 7 April 1992; 34 years ago (star removed); 22 July 2002; 24 years ago (standardized)
- Design: A red field with a black two-headed eagle in the center.
- Designed by: Sadik Kaceli (modern eagle symbol)
- Use: Civil ensign
- Proportion: 2:3
- Design: A horizontal tricolour with red on the top and bottom stripes, and black in the middle.
- Vertical version of the flag used when being hung as a banner.

The national flag of Albania (Albanian: Flamuri i Shqipërisë) depicts a silhouetted black double-headed eagle in the center of a red background. The red stands for bravery, strength, valour and bloodshed, while the eagle – traditionally the symbol of Albanians – represents the sovereign state of Albania. The flag was established as the national flag of Albania when the country gained its independence from the Ottoman Empire in 1912.

== Origin ==
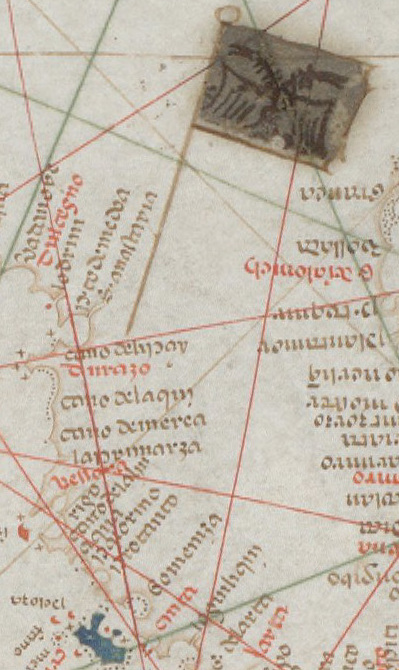
15th-century Flag of Albania

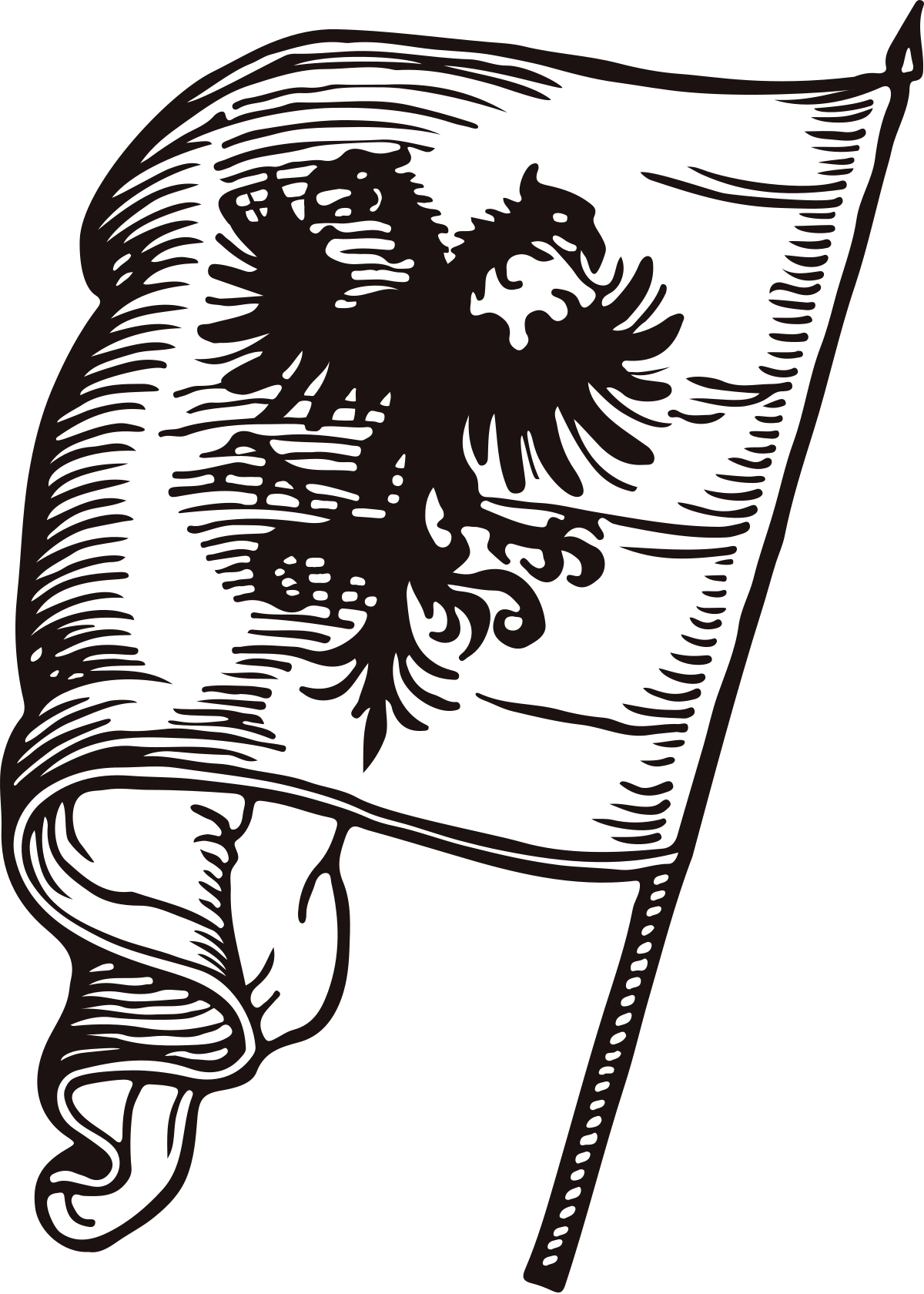
Flag of Albania (1598)

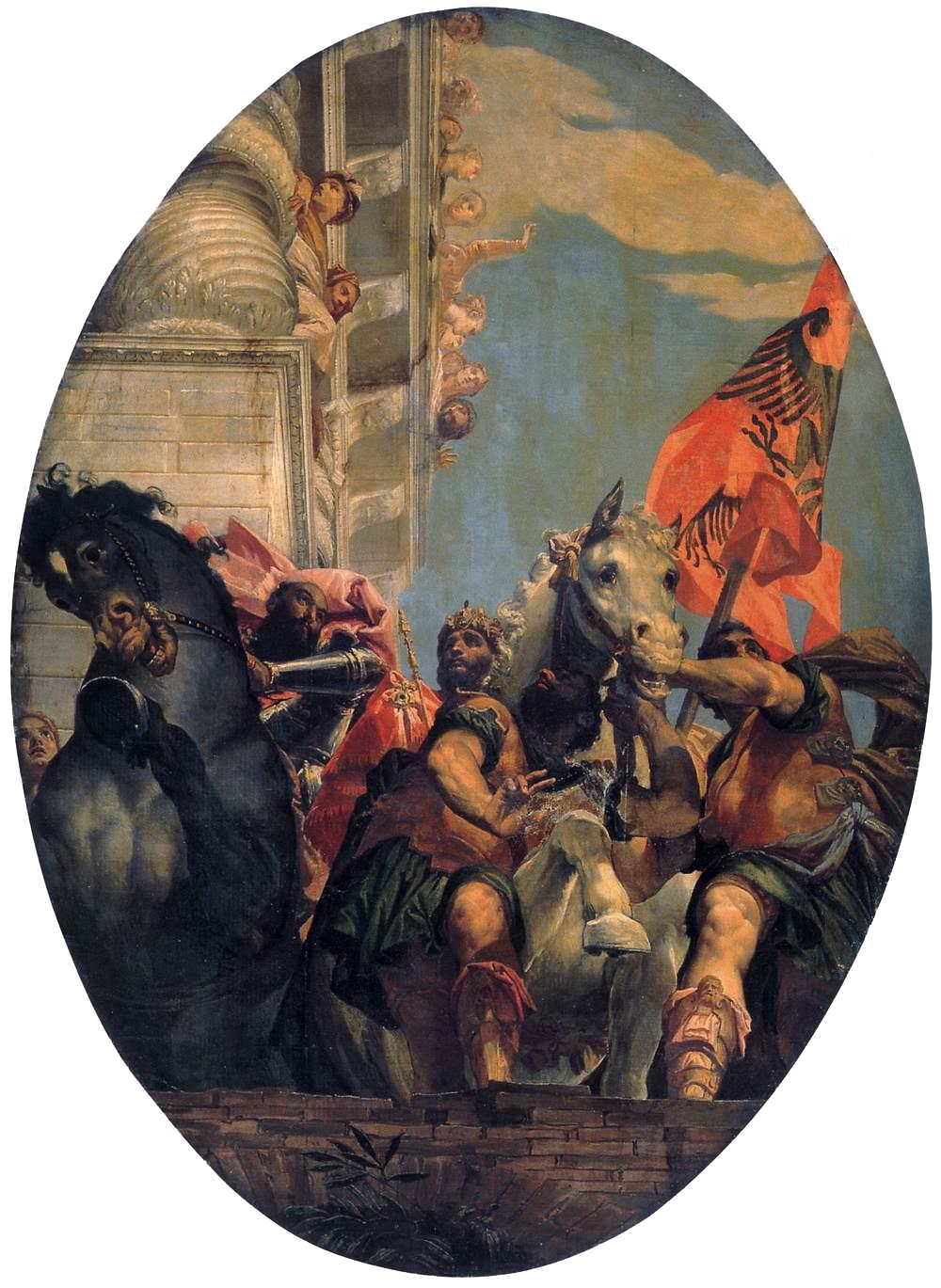
Trionfo di Mardocheo by Paolo Veronese in the church of San Sebastiano, Venice, 1556. According to a modern analysis of the painting, Skanderbeg who holds the Albanian flag is depicted as the Biblical hero Mordechai who saved the Hebrews in the Babylonian Empire.

During John Hunyadi's campaign in Niš in 1443, Skanderbeg and a few hundred Albanians defected from the Turkish ranks; for twenty-five years he scored remarkable victories against the Ottomans. He adopted the similar Eastern Roman imperial flag, with the double-headed eagle and the red background, and his victories brought him the papal title Athleta Christi. The eagle was used for heraldic purposes in the Middle Ages by a number of noble families in Albania and became the symbol of the Albanians. The Kastrioti's coat of arms, depicting a black double-headed eagle on a red field, became famous when he led a revolt against the Ottoman Empire resulting in the independence of Albania from 1443 to 1479. This was the flag of the League of Lezhë, which was the first unified Albanian state in the Middle Ages and the oldest representative political body in the country with extant records.

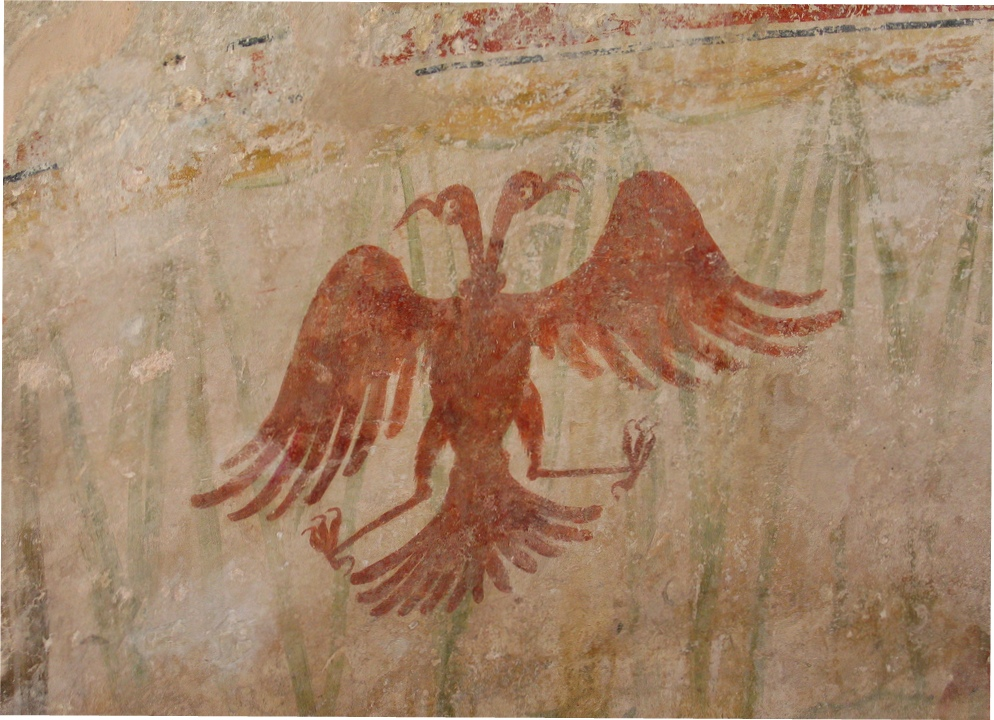
Double-headed eagle found in a mural inside the Shën Ndoji church in Rodon, possibly dating from the 15th century

The symbol of the double-headed black eagle on a red background was re-used by Albanian nationalists during the 19th and early 20th centuries as a symbol of their campaign for their country's independence from the Ottoman Empire. In Ottoman territory, the first time it was raised in possibly over 400 years is the Battle of Deçiq (6 April) in the Albanian revolt of 1911. It was raised by the rebellion leader Ded Gjo Luli on the peak of Bratila (present-day Tuzi Municipality) after victory was secured. The phrase Tash o vllazën do t’ju takojë të shihni atë që për 450 vjet se ka pa kush (Now brothers you have earned the right to see that which has been unseen for 450 years) has been attributed to Ded Gjo Luli by later memoirs of those who were present when he raised the flag. It was one of three banners brought to Malësia by Palokë Traboini, student in Austria. The other two banners were used by Ujka of Gruda and Prelë Luca of Triepshi.

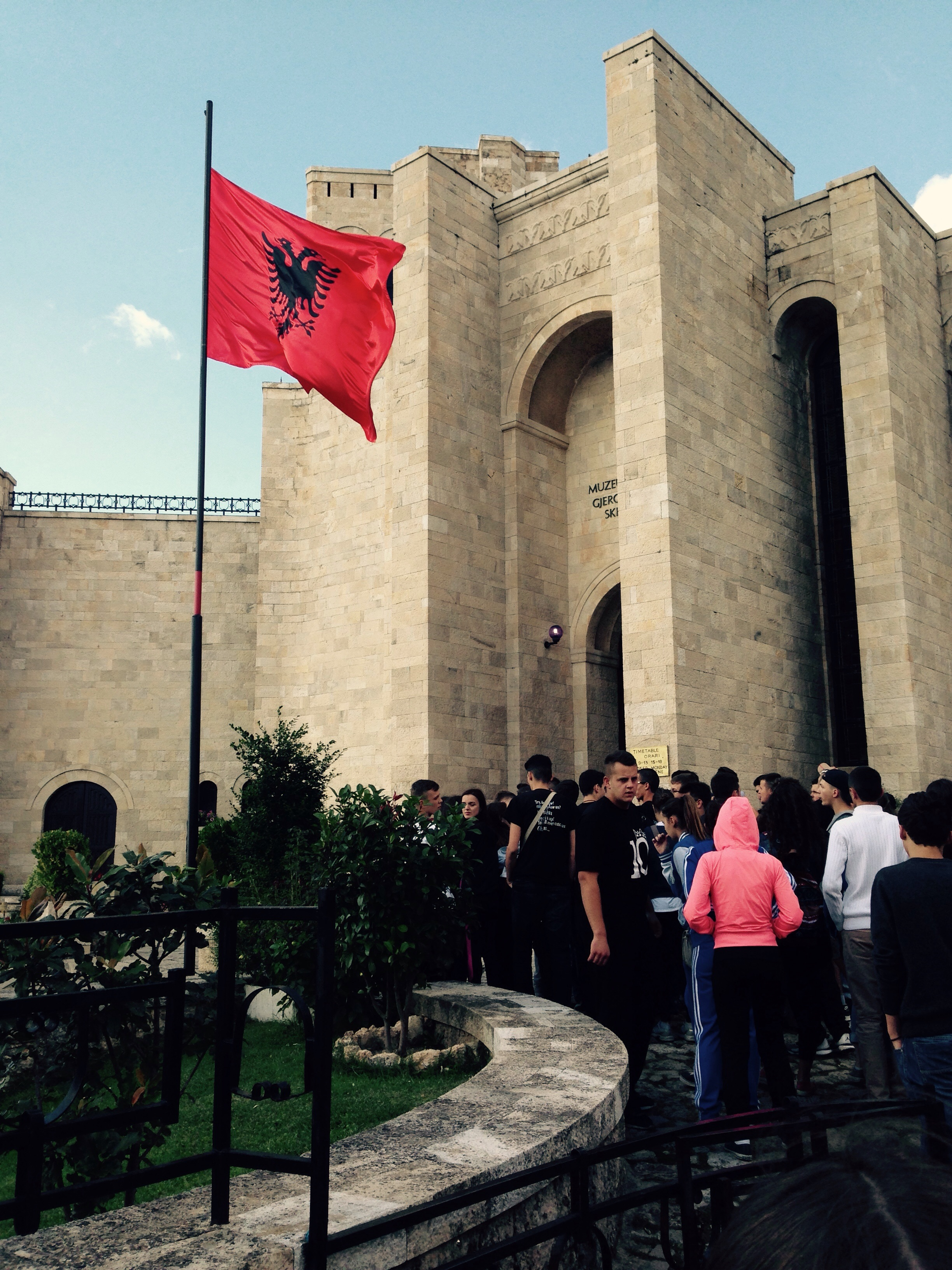
Albanian flag on a pole at the entrance of Krujë Castle

The Albanian flag has gone through a number of changes over the years as different regimes have modified it. During the reign of King Zog (r. 1928–1939), a crown was added to the flag and was replaced by two fasces during the Italian occupation of Albania. After World War II, the communist regime added a five-pointed golden star, which was removed on 7 April 1992 after the communist government in Albania collapsed.

Albania's maritime flags—the civil ensign and the naval ensign—are both different from the national flag. The civil ensign consists of three horizontal bands of red, black, and red. The naval ensign is similar to the national flag, except that the eagle is on a white field, and the lower portion of the flag has a red stripe. The eagle of the flag of Albania is depicted on the reverse of the Albanian five lekë coin, issued in 1995 and 2000.

Beginning in 1969, the flag of Albania was widely unofficially flown in Kosovo by the country's ethnic Albanian population. The flag was the symbol of the self-declared proto-state Republic of Kosova during the 1990s. Kosovo uses a different flag that was designed to avoid any symbols associated with a particular ethnic group, similarly to the flags of Bosnia and Herzegovina and Cyprus.

== National flag ==
The national flag of Albania was standardized by Law Nr.8926, dated 22 July 2002 of the constitution and defined in articles II, III and IV.

The color scheme laid out below, pertaining to the rules of heraldry, begins with the peripheral color followed by the nearest color.

RED: #FF0000

RGB: 255–0–0
HSL: 0°–100%–100%
HSV: 0°–100%–50%
CMYK: 0 –100% – 100% – 0
XYZ: 41.2400–21.2600–1.9300
LAB: 53.2329–80.1093–67.2201
Luminance: 54%
Distance: 1

BLACK: #000000

RGB: 0–0–0
HSL: 0°–0%–0%
HSV: 0°–0%–0%
CMYK: 0 – 0 – 0 –100%
XYZ: 0.0000–0.0000–0.0000
LAB: 0.0000–0.0000–0.0000
Luminance: 0%
Distance: 0

A summarized translation of the law is written below:

§ Article II – Definition

1. The national flag is a national symbol.

§ Article III – Shapes and dimensions of the national flag
1. The national flag represents a blood red field, with a black double-headed eagle in the center, with open wings on the sides. Each of the eagle's wings has nine feathers, while the tail has seven feathers.
2. The dimensions of the national flag have an aspect ratio of 1:1.4
3. The appearance of the national flag, the strength of its colors and the ratios are those defined in appendix no.1, which is attached to this law and is an integral part of it.

§ Article IV – Usage of the national flag
1. Every Albanian citizen has the right to hold, raise or use the national flag.
2. All public institutions are obliged to place the national flag inside or outside their facilities. It is forbidden to raise or place foreign flags, except in cases of receptions or protocol ceremonies and other solemnities, provided by law, but always accompanied by the national flag. In this case the national flag can not be smaller than other flags.
3. The national flag is used in cases of ceremonial meetings of state institutions with representatives of foreign countries; freely at the desks of officials in state institutions and by legal entities; in buildings and vehicles of representatives of the Republic of Albania serving abroad and in all cases when Albania is officially represented as an involved party. The national flag is laid in the most visible place or in the same place where the other flags are laid.

4. In case of a national mourning, announced by a decision of the Council of Ministers, the national flag is raised at half-mast.

== State flags ==
=== Flag raised on Independence Day (1912) ===
According to researcher and art conservator Frederik Stamati and his colleague Ariola Prifti, an ethnographic fund specialist at the Center for Albanological Studies, there is no trace evidence of the original flag that was raised in Vlorë on 28 November 1912, the day Albania declared its independence. This viewpoint is reaffirmed in an editorial by news media Top Channel dated 1 November 2012 and titled "The mystery of the first Albanian flag". It concludes that "there is no definitive proof" on how the raised flag looked on the day Albania declared its independence, while providing ten hypotheses.

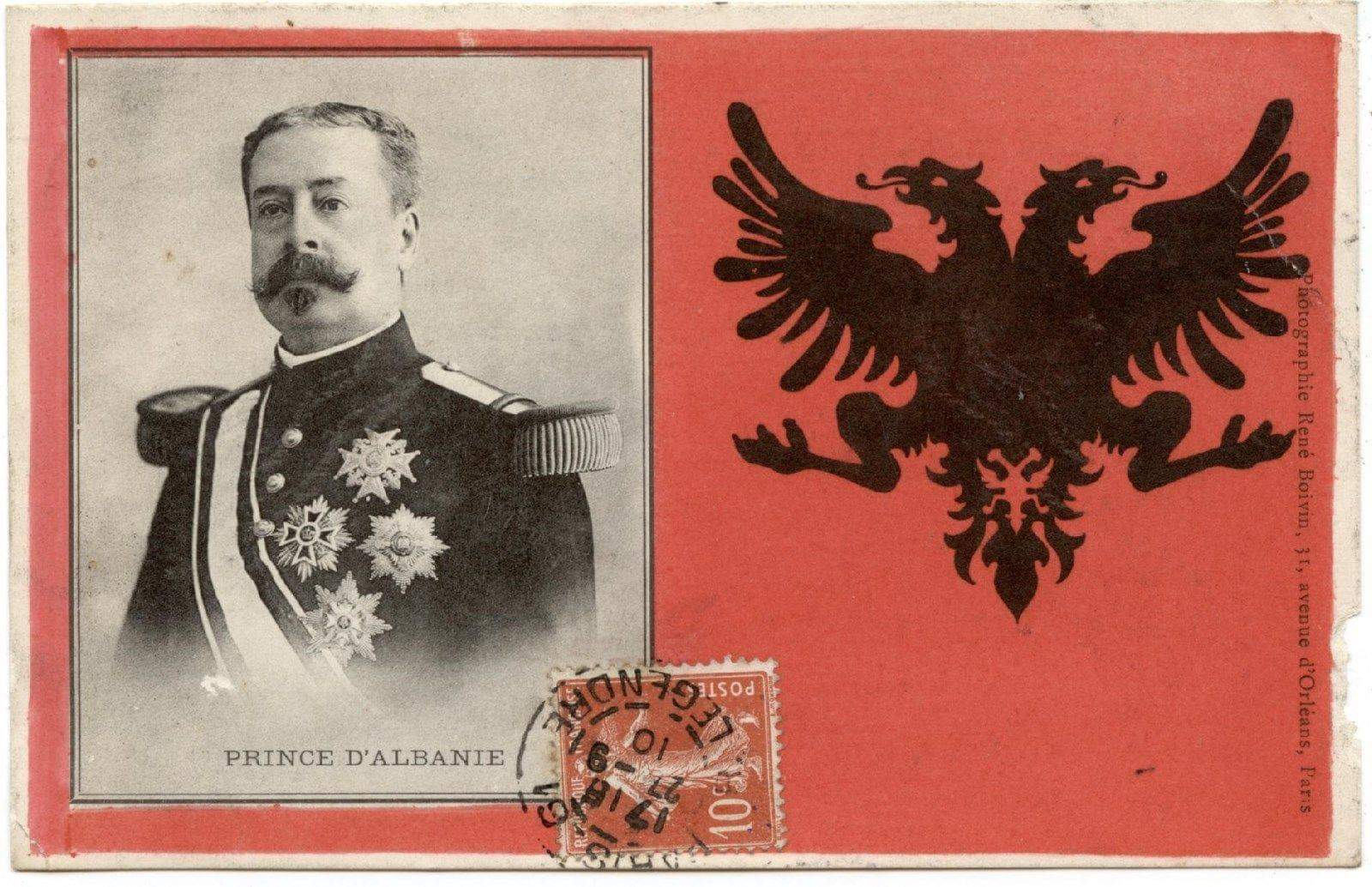
Postcard showing an illustration of the Albanian flag alongside a photograph of Aladro Kastriota (c. 1913)

A model of the flag often perceived as the original is seen in a 1913 postcard that shows alongside it a photograph of Don Aladro Kastriota in uniform. Eqrem bey Vlora writes in his memoirs, published posthumously as "Lebenserinnerungen", Munich (1968–1973), that sometime in 1909 while visiting Paris, he had the good fortune to meet Don Aladro, a wealthy spanish-basque diplomat and a strong supporter of the Albanian cause who at one point had announced his candidacy for the Albanian throne by claiming descent from the House of Kastrioti through his paternal grandmother, a noblewoman that lived during the era of Charles III. With his financial means and some propaganda, he made known the Albanian cause for independence in European political circles. During their meeting, Vlora asserts the following episode occurred:

"After dinner, a servant brought a red velvet box on a silver tray and placed it in front of Don Aladro. He got up and gave a beautiful speech… and then opened the velvet box and took out an Albanian flag, a black double-headed eagle on the red field and gave it to me…"

For five years I kept this flag in the bedroom hanging with a nail on the side of the bed, until the day really came that Don Aladro had prophesied. Suddenly and quite by chance, this flag was raised as a symbol of Albania's Independence. Well, on November 28, the main object of the day, the flag as a symbol of independence, with that typical Albanian carelessness was forgotten… then, my friend Hydai efendi gets up and says that in the bedroom of Eqrem bey hangs an Albanian flag on the wall, enclosed in a beautiful frame and asked if it could be picked up without being neat there? Ismail bey gave him permission and so the flag that Don Aladro had once solemnly given me in Paris, traveled to the neighboring guest house and fell into the hands of Ismail bey, who handed it over to Murad bey Toptani, with the order to hang it outside, while he himself stood in the window."

Lebenserinnerungen", Munich (1968–1973)

— Eqrem Vlora

More support is given to this thesis in the testimony of Syrja bey Vlora who in his book of memoirs titled "From the End of Ottoman Rule to the War of Vlora", writes in page 70 the following: "On 28 November, with the desire and consent of all, it was decided to raise the flag of Albania and declare National Independence. As it was not possible to prepare the flag that day, a flag was taken from our house, which my son Eqrem had been guarding with full respect since 1908(?). It rose amid the cheerful manifestations and cheers of the people."

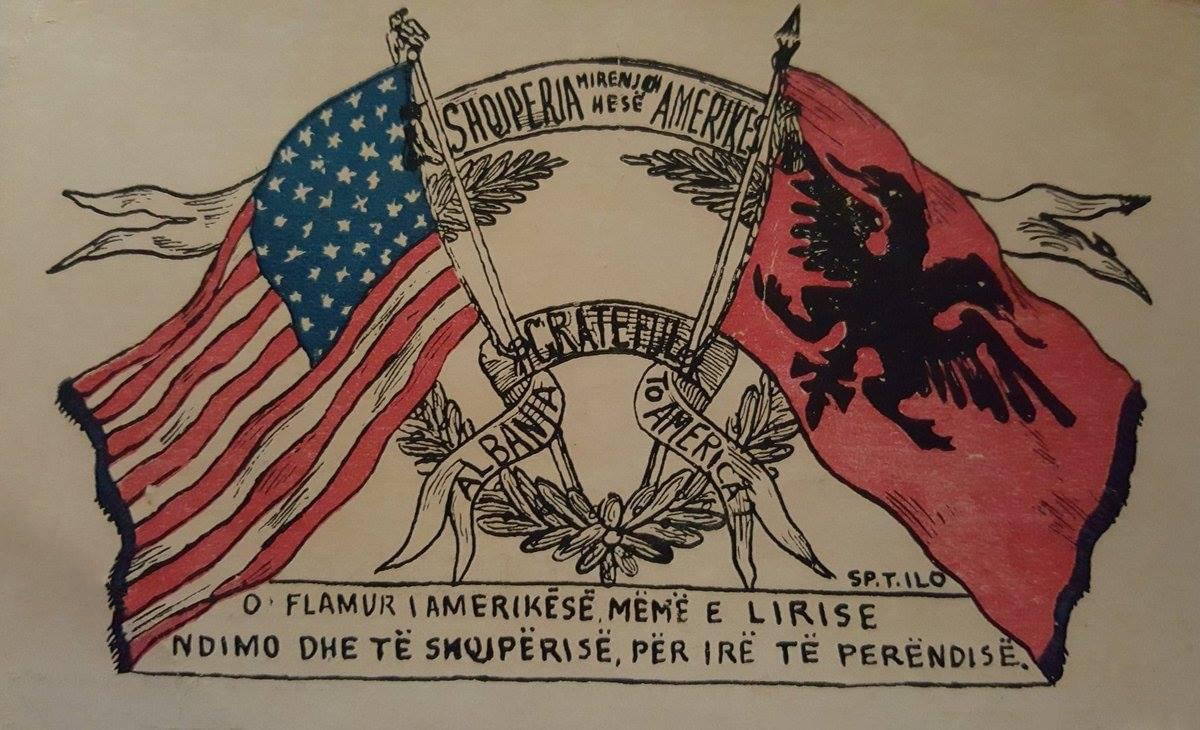
This postcard by Spiridon Ilo, was printed as a sign of gratitude for the US assistance in reaffirming the legitimacy of the new Albanian State. The postcard came into circulation in 1920, the year when President Woodrow Wilson famously arbitrated his support for the independence of Albania at the Paris Peace Conference.

Historian Valentina Duka provides further insights into this argument in her book "History of Albania, 1912–2000", where she publishes authentic documents from the archives of the Ministry of Foreign Affairs. From these documents, we learn of the efforts made by the government of Prime Minister Kostaq Kotta, to collect historical objects of this era and to house them at the National History Museum. In 1930, the minister of foreign affairs Rauf Fico, began a correspondence with Eqrem bey Vlora, who at the time was serving as the ambassador of Albania in Athens. In these communications, Eqrem bey strongly emphasizes that the flag raised on the day of the declaration of independence is indeed the one that was given to him by Aladro Kastriota. He goes on to explain that the flag along with other personal possessions, were confiscated and burned during 1915, by the government of the so-called Autonomous Republic of Northern Epirus in the home of a family friend in Delvinë. They had been transferred there for safekeeping from the rebel forces of Central Albania that had invaded Vlorë.

Latin merchant flag of the Ottoman Empire.

Kristo Floqi writes in the weekly newspaper Arbënia in 1936, that "the national flag that was raised for the first time had been "crafted" with her own hands by Marigo Posio from a cloth purchased by a local drapery merchant named Diamanti and based on the model drawn by Dom Mark Vasa and Petro Fotografi". In a later correspondence that Floqi writes to the editor of Drita Newspaper, dated 17 January 1937 and titled "The designer of the flag that was flown in Vlorë for the declaration of our independence", in response to Kol Rodhe, the flag is described as "a thin red woven cloth, 3 meters long and 2 meters wide and on which a black double-headed vulture was branded". Floqi may have had such knowledge of the flag as his brother Thanas was one of the signatories of the Declaration of Independence and Floqi himself was married to Urani Poçi, the sister of Marigo Posio. This second hypothesis is also supported by Posio's assistant, Thina Ferra who claims the following:

Marigo painted the eagle with black holes herself and that I warmed this flag near the brazier to dry it quickly. The flag that we did was a bit like whitened, in red pepper paint. We painted a lot of other flags to distribute to the people, including a small Albanian eagle that we sealed on the white shell caps of all the labs who participated in the manifestations.

Vinçenc Prennushi (O.F.M.) wrote in "Gjeth e Lule" his immortal romance "Grueja Shqyptare" which is thought to have been inspired by Marigo Posio.

=== Flag of the Provisional Government (1912–1914) ===
Illustration of the flag found on the cover page of the 7th issue of Zër' i Popullit newspaper, dated 17 December 1912.

The weekly Albanian language newspaper Zër' i Popullit (Albanian: The People's Voice), based in New York City, published on the cover page of its 7th issue, dated 17 December 1912, a color illustration of the Albanian flag. It shows a striking resemblance to another illustration found on the cover page of the 16th issue of the 2nd annual edition of Perlindja e Shqipëniës newspaper, the official publication of the newly formed Albanian State, dated 7 March 1914.

=== Flag of the self-proclaimed Republic of Central Albania (1913–1914) ===
Personal flag of Essad Pasha

Recently, while researching the archives of the German Ministry of Foreign Affairs, scholar Marenglen Kasmi observed a paper envelope which contained a letter signed by Essad Pasha Toptani and addressed by the Austro-Hungarian royal imperial embassy in Berlin to the German Ministry of Foreign Affairs, dated 7 May 1915. In it, a piece of cloth roughly 20 by 30 cm in length, in light red color with a white star polygon at the lower right corner is presented as the "national flag" with Essad Pasha identifying himself as interim president and general supreme commander. What stands out about this flag is its resemblance to the Ottoman flag, where only the crescent has been removed.

=== Flag of the Principality of Albania (1914–1920) ===
Flag of the Principality of Albania

The Albanian flag used around 1914, during the short-lived Principality of Albania under Prince Wilhelm of Wied, featured a red field with a black double-headed eagle in the center. This design, rooted in the 1912 independence, commonly included a yellow-bordered red flag with a specific, detailed eagle—sometimes with crowns—representing the new sovereign, yet volatile, European-backed state.

=== Flag of the Principality of Albania (1915) ===
Flag of the Principality of Albania that was once in the possession of Italian diplomat Baron Carlo Aliotti.

The National History Museum presently has in its archive a total of 15 flags that date as far back as 1880. One of these flags belongs to the period of Prince Wilhelm's reign. It was given to the museum as a gift by diplomat Rauf Fico who had found it abandoned in the prince's palace some years later. The flag is in a rather poor state making it difficult to restore and digitally reconstruct. A slightly different image of the flag is found in Jaho Brahaj's book "Flamuri i Kombit Shqiptar" that shows the flag in a deteriorated form, without the shielded peacock and with a gold star on top. A similar model can be corroborated in Artan Lame's book "Princi i Shqiptarëve" that shows a shielded purple-colored peacock and the eagle wingspan in a more compact form with the historically accurate five-pointed white star hovering at the top. A 2012 auction in Genoa, Italy unveiled for the first time the flag of the principality, physically intact, displayed inside a square laminated wooden frame with the descriptive title shown at the bottom in golden letters embossed onto a black coated strip. The flag which was found in Durrës on 20 December 1915, had been taken from there by italian diplomat Baron Carlo Aliotti aboard the Austrian destroyer SMS Lika.

=== Flag of the Autonomous Province of Korçë (1916–1920) ===
Flag of the Autonomous Province of Korçë

The protocol agreement on the Autonomous Province of Korçë states in Article IX:

"The Kaza of Korytza flag will be the traditional standard of Skanderbeg with the tricolor tie in the colors of the French flag."

A transient flag was previously raised from the second floor balcony of the prefecture building by the police prefect Themistokli Gërmenji. Present in the public ceremony were the French commander Henri Descoings and his military personnel. Official surviving flags of this period are currently housed at the Flag Museum in Korçë.

=== Flag of the Congress of Lushnjë (1920) ===
The flag held at the Congress of Lushnjë.

=== Flag of the Congress of Lushnjë (1920–1926) ===
Flag of the Albanian Republic (1920–1926)

The flag used at the Congress of Lushnjë was identified for the first time on 25 November 2011 inside the archives of the Ethnographic Fund at the Center for Albanological Studies.

The flag is made of dark red silk or taffeta (xanthocellulose artificial silk) and has in its center a black two-headed eagle, stylized in the shape of the same eagle used by the provisional government, since a national flag had not yet been formalized. On one side of the flag there are three metal rings, which serve to tie the flag to the handle. Its dimensions are 121 cm – 70 cm.

The flag was in the possession of patriot Veli Vasjari who had carried it inside the building where the proceedings of the congress were held. In 1928, it was donated to the National History Museum and it has been a part of its ethnographic fund ever since.

=== Flag of the Albanian Republic (1925–1928) ===
The flag of the republic was depicted in square form as all other flags of this era.

State symbols during the period of the Republic were always shown in square form. This was preponderant with the national flag, state emblem, presidential insignia and even symbols used in commerce. The flag of the republic is seen for the first time in Teki Selenica's encyclopedic guide book Shqipria më 1927, e illustruar, page 124.

=== Flag of the Albanian Kingdom (1928–1939) ===
Flag of Albania used from 1928 to 1934.

Flag of Albania used from 1934 to 1939.

The royal flag was widely used by government institutions, the army and embassies abroad.

Article III of the Fundamental Statute of the Albanian Kingdom describes the flag as red with a black two-headed eagle in the center. A variant of this flag is on display at the Mezuraj Museum. The square-shaped flag, currently in the possession of the Royal Family, was produced in the latter period of King Zog's reign and can be seen in an archived film footage being replaced by fascist officers during the unveiling ceremony of the new fascist flag, on 4 December 1939.

=== Flag of the Kingdom of Albania (1939–1943) ===
Flag used during the period of the Italian occupation of the Kingdom of Albania.

The Yearbook of the Kingdom of Albania in its 1940–XVIII edition, describes in Title I, Article II of the Constitutional Charter the following:

The Albanian flag is red, charged at the center with the black double-headed eagle and the sign of the lictor fasces.

Images of the flag used during this time are available at the Istituto Luce archive. The flag is displayed at different public events, from the inauguration of a local school by prime minister Shefqet Vërlaci to the opening session of the Albanian Fascist Party congress which was held at the Palace of the Superior Fascist Corporative Council.

=== Flag of Albania under Nazi Germany (1943–1944) ===
Flag used during the period of the German occupation of the Kingdom of Albania.

In October 1943 the union with Italy was officially dissolved and the country reverted to the decrees of September 1928. The pre-Italian flags and symbols were used during this period.

=== Flag of the Democratic Government of Albania (1944–1946) ===
Flag used in the opening session of the Constitutional Assembly – 10 January 1946.

The flag used by the Democratic Government of Albania, which was the first ruling government following the war of liberation, was published for the first time in the War Bulletin of National Liberation (Albanian: Buletin i Luftës Nacional-Çlirimtare), issue nr.51 dated 28 November 1944. The usage of this specific flag is widely seen in public events and military court sessions. It has also been confirmed in the 1980 publication by the Marxist-Leninist Studies Institute titled "Epopeja e Luftës Antifashiste Nacionalçlirimtare e Popullit Shqiptar 1939–1944". Prior to this, a transient flag of a different contour with moderately outstretched wings was used at the Congress of Përmet and subsequently at the first Anti-Fascist Youth Congress (BRASH).

=== Flag of the People's Socialist Republic of Albania ===
Flag of the People's Socialist Republic of Albania used from 1946 until 1992.

A change to the flag adopted in early 1946 placed a golden star above the eagle. Law nr.5506, dated 28 December 1976 of the constitution of the People's Socialist Republic of Albania in Chapter III, Article I, Title CVIII describes the flag as follows:

§ Article CVIII – Flag
The state flag of the People's Socialist Republic of Albania represents a red field with a black double-headed eagle in the center, on top of which is a red star with five corners, embroidered all around in gold. The ratio between the width and the length of the flag is 1:1-40.

The flag symbols were designed by painter Sadik Kaceli. On 7 April 1992, the Assembly formed after the early elections, in the afternoon session voted to remove the communist emblem as the official symbol of the state, the removal of the golden star from the flag and initiated a parliamentary commission tasked with studying the proposals of a new emblem of the state.

== Presidential flag ==
Flag of the president of Albania

The symbols of the presidency, which include the flag, the emblem and the "Mother Teresa" Decoration, were approved by a presidential decree dated 10 July 2014 by President Bujar Nishani. The presidential flag is described as follows:

"The predominant colors are the colors of the national flag (red background and black eagle) and the golden color has been added which symbolizes strength, prosperity and endurance. The decorative symbols of the flag are the black eagle taken from the coat of arms of the House of Kastrioti, accepting it as one of the most ancient symbols used by the Albanian leader, the (golden) Skanderbeg helmet positioned in a straight frontal stance, symbolizing impartiality and determination in representing national unity, as well as oak (golden) leaves which represent longevity, strength and dignity, also taken as a symbol from antiquity used by King Gentius of the Illyrians. The use of the crown-shaped oak branches is also seen as a plinth which holds the other elements in place. Dimensions are specified as 140cm x 100 cm."

== Unicode ==
The flag of Albania is represented as the Unicode emoji sequence U+1F1E6 🇦 REGIONAL INDICATOR SYMBOL LETTER A and U+1F1F1 🇱 REGIONAL INDICATOR SYMBOL LETTER L, making "🇦🇱".

== See also ==
- Flag of Albania (List)
- Flag of Kosovo (List)
- Coat of arms of Albania (Armorial)
- Emblem of Kosovo (Armorial)
- Albanian heraldry
