= National symbols of Kosovo =

National symbols of Kosovo are the symbols that are used in Kosovo to represent what is unique about the nation, reflecting different aspects of its cultural life and history.

Type	Image	Symbol
National flag		Flag of Kosovo The flag of Kosovo shows six white stars in an arc above a golden map of Kosovo on a blue field. The stars symbolise Kosovo's six major ethnic groups.
Coat of arms		Coat of arms of Kosovo The coat of arms shows six white stars in an arc above a solid golden shape of Kosovo as seen on a standard projection map, placed on a rounded triangular shield with a blue field and a golden border. Its central figures, the stars and the shape, are also the content of the new blue flag of Kosovo, already adopted at the same time.
National anthem	Anthem of the Republic of Kosovo National anthem of Kosovo	Anthem of the Republic of Kosovo is the official national anthem of Kosovo. It has no official lyrics, but de facto lyrics are in use. It was adopted on 11 June 2008 and chosen because it contained no references to any specific ethnic group.
National day		Independence Day commemorates Kosovo's unilateral declaration of independence from Serbia on 17 February 2008.

== See also ==
- Armorial of Kosovo
- List of flags of Kosovo
