= Coat of arms of Albania =

Coat of arms

- Coat of arms of the Republic

Versions
- Seal of the President

- Seal of the Prime Minister
- Armiger: Republic of Albania
- Adopted: 28 November 1998 (by presidential decree nr. 2260); 10 July 2003 (standardized by government decision nr. 474)
- Shield: Gules, a double-headed eagle displayed Sable, above it a helmet in profile Or, with a curved plume, all within a bordure Or.
- Earlier version(s): from: 1914–1998 1914–1925, Principality of Albania; 1926–1929, Albanian Republic; 1929–1939, Albanian Kingdom; 1939–1943, Kingdom of Albania; 1946–1992, Communist Albania; 1992–1998, Republic of Albania
- Use: in the seals and at the entrance of state institutions; as a distinctive sign in state objects; in all official acts; in documents and agreements of the Albanian state with foreign countries, based on reciprocity.

The coat of arms of Albania (Albanian: Stema e Republikës së Shqipërisë) is an adaptation of the flag of Albania and is based on the symbols of Gjergj Kastrioti Skanderbeg. It features the black double-headed eagle, documented in official use since 1458, as evidenced from a sealed document uncovered in the Vatican Secret Archive (fund: Miscellanea, vol. XXXIX, doc. 2398), addressed to Pope Pius II and co-sealed by notary Johannes Borcius de Grillis. The stylized gold helmet is partially based on the model of crown-like rank that once belonged to Skanderbeg, currently on display at the Kunsthistorisches Museum in Vienna, first mentioned in 1593 in the Ambras armory inventory and depicted in 1601/03 in the "Armamentarium Heroicum" of Jakob Schrenck von Notzing. The ruler of Austria, Ferdinand II, acquired the helmet from the Duke of Urbino, so mentioned in a letter sent to him from the duke, dated 15 October 1578.

The helmet as an integral component in the coat of arms was instituted for the first time by the president of the republic Ahmet Zogu on 12 July 1926.

== Official regulation ==
The coat of arms of the Republic is described in Article 14 of the Constitution of Albania:

"The coat of arms of the Republic of Albania represents a shield with a red field and a black two-headed eagle at the center. On top of the shield, in golden color, is placed the helmet of Skanderbeg."

Dimensions of the coat of arms of the Republic as outlined by government decision no. 474, dated 10 July 2003.: ◆red:100%; ◆gold:100%; ◆black:0%

The design is further specified in articles VII and VIII of Law 8926:

§ Article VII – Shapes and dimensions of the coat of arms

1. The coat of arms of the Republic of Albania is a state symbol. It represents a shield, blood red in color, with an eagle in the center, identical to the eagle of the national flag. At the top of the shield, in golden color, is placed the helmet of Skanderbeg, in right profile. The dimensions of the shield have an aspect ratio of 1:1.5.

§ Article VIII – Usage of the coat of arms
1. The coat of arms of the Republic of Albania is held and used only by institutions of the central government. The coat of arms is placed at the main entrance of the institution, above its name.
2. The coat of arms of the Republic of Albania is placed on the seals of state institutions, in their official acts, on the official naming of state institutions and in any other act that the state institution addresses to third parties. The coat of arms is used as an identification mark on the working tools of the state institution and in the working environments.

3. The coat of arms of the Republic of Albania, when accompanied by the coat of arms of other states, is laid in the most visible place or in the same place with them.

== Expanded usage ==
The expanded usage of the coat of arms of the Republic is explained by decision no. 474 of the Council of Ministers, dated 10 July 2003.

ON THE METHOD OF USING THE COAT OF ARMS OF THE REPUBLIC AS WELL AS THE RAPPORT OF ITS DIMENSIONS

In support of paragraph 2 of article 100 of the Constitution and paragraph 4 of article 8 of law no. 8926, dated 22.7.2002 "On the shape and dimensions of the national flag, for the carrying of the national anthem, the shape and dimensions of the coat of arms of the Republic of Albania and how to use them", with the proposal of the Minister of Culture, Youth and Sports, the Council of Ministers decided:

2. When the coat of arms of the Republic serves as a denomination at the entrance of state institutions, a standard sign board measuring 500x700 mm, with horizontal placement, is used. The field of the sign board should be golden, while the writing should be in black. In the upper part of the board, "REPUBLIKA E SHQIPËRISË" is written in capital letters and, if any, subordinate structures are marked in a vertical line. In the center of the sign board is placed the coat of arms of the Republic, measuring 100x150 mm, while below it, also in capital letters, is the name of the institution, according to the models given in figure 2 of the appendix, which is attached to this decision.

3. The geometric description of the seals, where the coat of arms of the Republic is used by state institutions, is as follows:

1. The diameter of the wet, dry or wax seal is the standard 40 mm. Exceptions are made for seals used by secretaries of the central institutions, which may be smaller in diameter and the dry seals of notaries, which, for technical reasons, are larger than the above mentioned standard.
2. The coat of arms of the Republic is always placed in the center of the seal, with variable dimensions, depending on the data contained in the seal.
3. In the outer circle, at the top of the seal, the words "Republika e Shqipërisë" are written, followed by the hierarchical administrative order, up to the institution in question and the location of its headquarters. The letters of the seal are all in capital, variable in size, but always visible, as shown in figure 3 of the appendix.

4. The coat of arms of the Republic, when used in official written acts, is placed at the top of the A4 sheet, in size 10/15 mm, while below it is written in capital letters "REPUBLIKA E SHQIPËRISË" and in the following lines, the name of the relevant institution. In instances where the coat of arms is not in color, then the coat of arms with black and white contours is used, but not by photocopying the coat of arms in white color. The use of the colored and the white coat of arms will be done according to models "a" and "b", of figure 4 of the appendix. The coat of arms of the Republic is also placed in a visible space on the identification certificates of citizens, on certificates or school diplomas, in public announcements of an official character from state entities, on licenses, etc.

The usage of the coat of arms of the Republic, is later included in the Official Ceremonial (Albanian: Ceremoniali Zyrtar), approved by decision no. 229, dated 23 April 2004 which states:

§ CHAPTER III – COAT OF ARMS OF THE REPUBLIC

- 3.1 The use of the coat of arms of the Republic is the exclusive right of state entities. The dimensions of the coat of arms of the Republic are indicative and expressed in the ratio 1:1.5.
- 3.2 The coat of arms of the Republic is placed:
  – at the entrance of state institutions, alongside their name;
  – in all official acts;
  – in the seals of state institutions;
  – as a distinctive sign of state objects;
  – in documents and agreements of the Albanian state with foreign countries, based on reciprocity.
- 3.3 Officially recognized are the coats of arms of different levels of local government, public entities, distinctive signs in various weaponry of the army, the police and universities approved by the State Protocol, on behalf of the Council of Ministers.

== Significance of the helmet ==
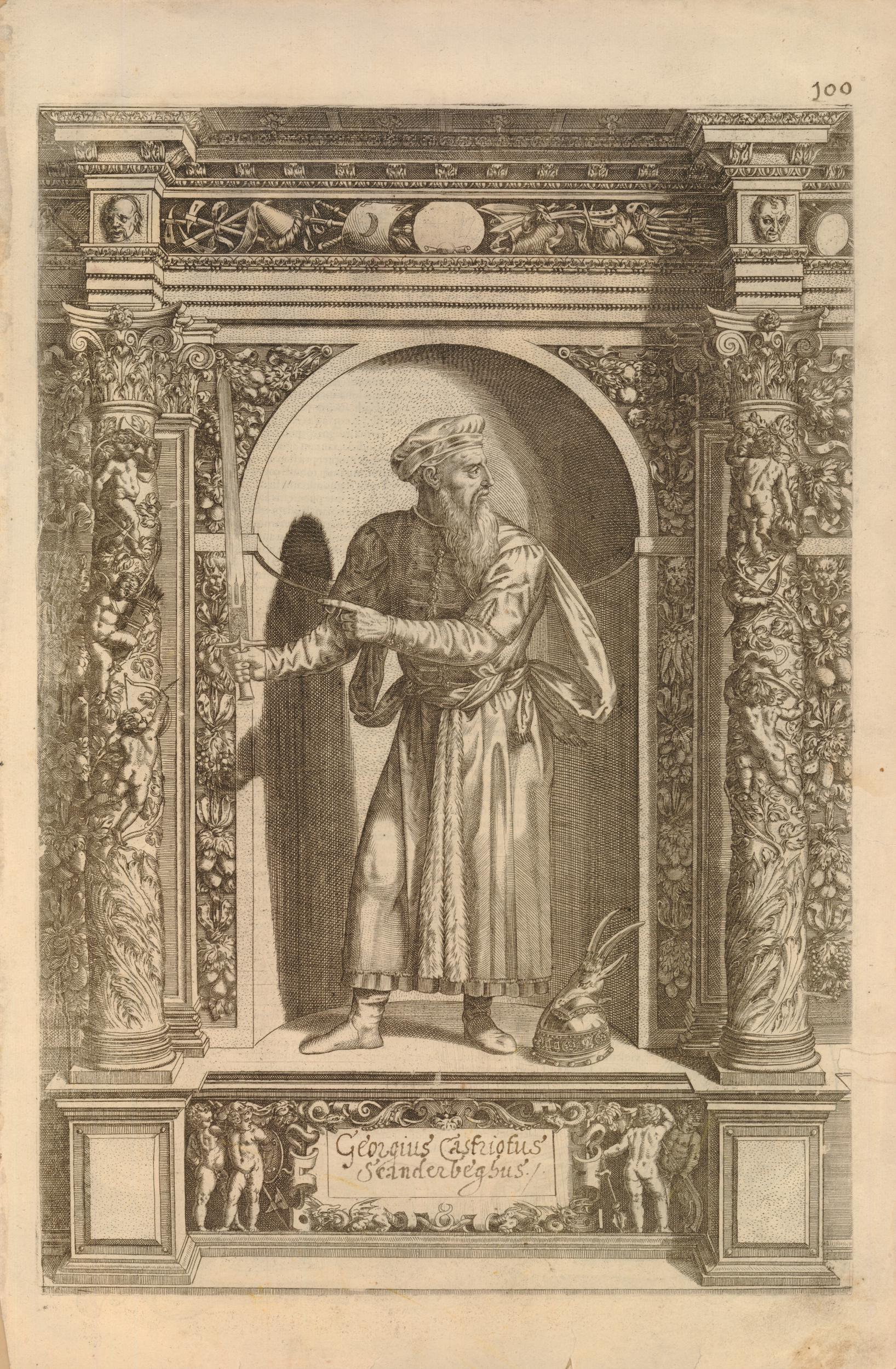
The helmet displayed in this 1601 engraving work by Flemish artist Dominicus Custos.

Skanderbeg's helmet is mentioned, along with two swords, in the inventory of the Ambras Castle armory in 1593, inherited by Archduke Ferdinand II and in the catalogue known as 'Armamentarium Heroicum' published in 1601 by Jakob Schrenk von Notzing. From one of 125 portraits of European princes in plates engraved by Dominicus Custos, after designs by Giovanni Battista Fontana, Skanderbeg is shown with the helmet and a sword. The plates were accompanied with a text by Schrenk von Notzing giving a brief profile of the subject. Archduke Ferdinand had himself led a campaign against the Ottomans in Hungary in 1556 at the behest of his father, Holy Roman Emperor Ferdinand I, so it was not perhaps surprising that he would want to include the arms of Skanderbeg in his collection.

In 1605, Ambras Castle was sold to the Austrian Emperor and in 1806 the arms were transferred to Belvedere Palace and then finally, in 1888, to the Kunsthistorisches Museum in Vienna. In recent years, the arms have been the subject of study by the museum's curator, Matthias Pfaffenbichler.

The iron forged helmet is likely of Italian origin, thought to have been made around 1460. The lower part of the helmet and the neck protection are missing and cracks in the base have been covered by a sewn leather band under which are traces of the original silk. A copper band with gold plated border is adorned with six rosettes, most of which are 16th century restorations, though the one at the back dates to the 15th century. Between the rosettes, an inscription in a particular type of Gothic minuscule on a hatched ground reads ‘in/per/ra/to/re/bt’.

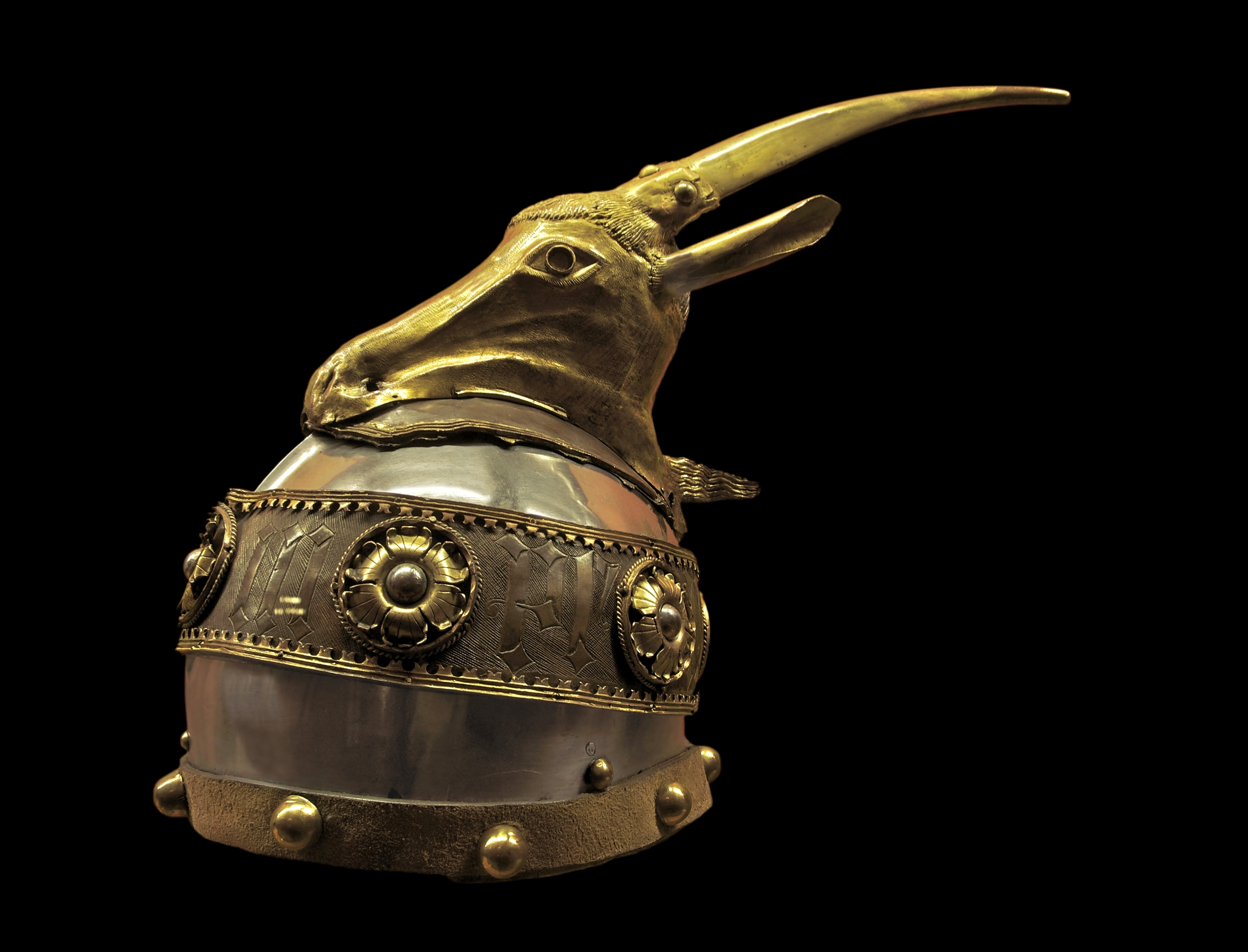
Helmet attributed to Skanderbeg currently on display at the Kunsthistorisches Museum in Vienna.

Skënder Anamali, an archaeologist and scholar on medieval history, has proposed that the decorative band with the inscription and the rosettes were added by Skanderbeg's descendants. The initials of the inscription are usually rendered as Jezus Nazarenus /Principi Emathie /Regi Albaniae * Terrori Osmanorum * Regi Epirotarum * Benedictat Te which translate as Jesus of Nazareth Blesses Thee Prince of Emathia, King (or Kingdom) of Albania, Terror of the Ottomans, King (or Kingdom) of Epirus. Such titles, however, were not used during Skanderbeg's lifetime.

Pfaffenbichler's close inspection of the inscription confirms the view that it was added to the helmet after Skanderbeg's lifetime. The transverse part of the letter ‘t’ is from a calligraphic font called Fraktur, developed by Wolfgang Spitzberg, the scribe of the Chancellery and used for the first time around 1500. Fraktur only appeared in wider use from 1517, about 50 years after the death of Skanderbeg. Therefore, it is reasonable to conclude that the decorative band with its inscription are not original – though one of the rosettes dating to the 15th century may possibly have been a replacement of an original fitting.

The helmet is distinguished for its goat's head crest. There are a number of theories explaining the association of the goat's head with Skanderbeg. One such theory is that it relates to the rams’ horns, a symbol of Zeus Ammon, worn by Alexander the Great, who was Epirote by descent from his mother Olympias. The famed King of Epirus, Pyrrhus, also wore a helmet that had, according to Plutarch, a "towering crest and … goat's horns".

The goat's head is partially hammered in copper, engraved and gold plated. The eye sockets that today are empty would have been inlaid. The shape of the crest hole on top of the helmet does not precisely mold into the shape needed for the goat's head crest so the two parts may have not originally gone together.

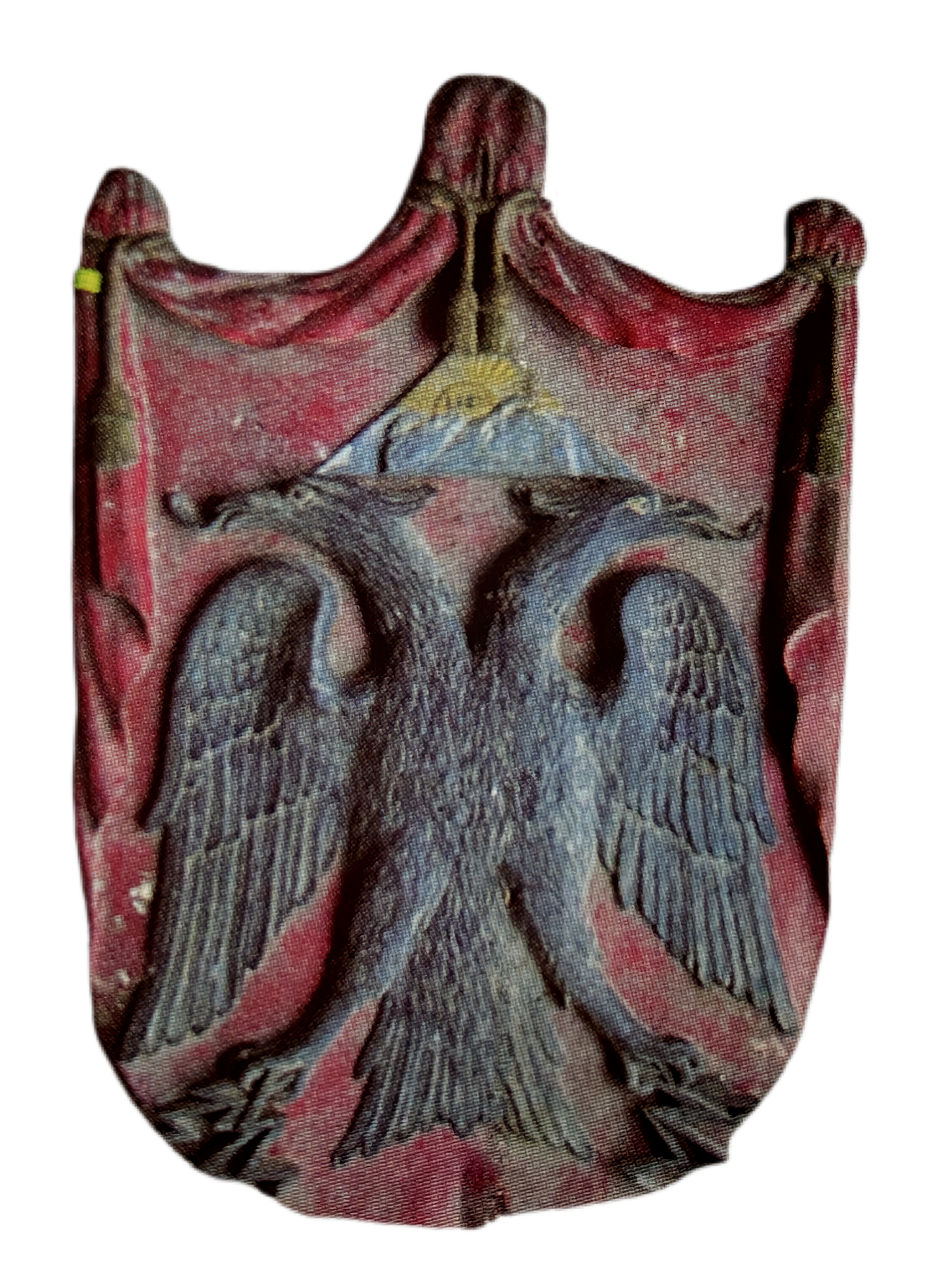
Prototype of a future coat of arms of Albania, carved in wood, during the period in which the country was under the supervision of the Austro–Hungarian Command (1916–1918).

== State coats of arms ==
Coat of arms	Description
Great Arms Diplomatic Seal	Coat of arms of the Principality of Albania (1914); The earliest usage of state symbols is prescribed in the Organic Statute of Albania, drafted by the International Commission of Control. Chapter II, titled "The sovereign", in articles 7 and 18 states: § The sovereign Art 7. The throne of the Albanian Principality is hereditary in the Family of Prince Gaillaume of Wied. Art 18. He has the right to have his graven image or his arms appear on the coins, medals and stamps of the State as well as on any piece or object representing governmental power. The official newspaper of the Albanian government, Perlindja e Shqipëniës, in its opening page article titled "Speech of the King's in-law – Royal Court – Crown of Albania", dated 28 February 1914, gives an elaborate depiction of the coat of arms: The crown of Albania, made of gold and lined with silk, has ten peaks. The middle peak, which is shorter than the others, bears the five-pointed star of Albania. The mantle of the Regent is most rich. Made of red, purple cloth, the lining of this cloak is of ermine and in the center it has the double-headed eagle of Albania with a red tongue and four lightning bolts between its claws. Additionally, a shield with the arms of the Wied family has been added to the eagle: the peacock on a golden field, turned to red and black, our national colors. On the overlay that is in the mouth of the cloak is embroidered in gold the Wied family motto "Fidelitate e Veritate", which means Loyalty and Truth. An illustration of the coat of arms was published for the first time in an article by Eberhard Freiherr von Wechmar in the weekly illustrated newspaper Die Woche dated 7 March 1914 (issue no. 10, p. 388). The extract from german reads: "A golden-armed, red-tongued black double-headed eagle with bundles of four golden thunderbolts in each fang, on the chest covered with a black-red embroidered shield bordered in gold, a wheeling natural-colored peacock, in frontal position, the whole under an ermine-lined golden-fringed purple mantle, which falls from the Albanian princely crown. Blue banner with Wied's motto "FIDELITATE ET VERITATE" in golden letters". The coat of arms is once more featured in the form of a diplomatic seal on a royal invitation letter addressed to captain N. Thomson, the brother of Lt. Colonel L.W.Thomson. It bears the prince's coat of arms and that of the family of princess Sophie, both under the Albanian crown.
Gold model Silver model	Coat of arms of the Albanian Republic (1926–1929); The Coat of Arms of the Albanian Republic was introduced by decree-law "On the state coats of arms and official flags", dated 12 July 1926: We, the President of the Albanian Republic, vested by the will of the people with the sovereign powers of the state; DECREE: Art. 1 The coat of arms of the state is the black Eagle with two heads, with a red layer on the eagle's chest. The Helm of Skanderbeg (in gold) surrounded by arms and banners. Four-sided coat of arms according to the sample. Art. 5 This decree-law enters into force from the day of its promulgation. A. Zogu d.v. Co-signed: Hysein Vrioni (Minister of Foreign Affairs), Sulejman Starova (Minister of Finances) and Musa Juka (Minister of Public Works and Agriculture). Teki Selenica's encyclopedic guide book Shqipria më 1927, e illustruar (p. 125) provides an illustration of the coat of arms whereby the helm with the arms and banners is displayed in silver profile. The usage of the silver model is reaffirmed in official documents of the Ministry of Internal Affairs' secret office from the late fall of 1929.
	Coat of arms of the Albanian Kingdom (1929–1939); A decree-law in reference to the new Coat of Arms of the State was published in Fletorja Zyrtare, dated 14 August 1929 (p. 7–8). The redaction is from the original print using a form of old gheg, conventional for the time: § Coat of arms of the State Art. 2 The coat of arms consists of: a) a mantle, with a crown on top b) a shield, in the center with a double-headed eagle Art. 3 The mantle is represented by a close toned red velvet fabric, placed symmetrically in a fold, slightly raised on the sides and tightened by two ribbons knotted together. The mantle features gold-washed leaves and is layered with white ermine leather with small gold endings. The mantle rises in the center and above it is the crown of Skanderbeg in lead and gold. Art. 4 The shield placed in the center of the mantle bears the double-headed Albanian eagle (with raised wings and divided into 9 feathers for each wing) placed on a red and gold field. Art. 5 The forms of the coat of arms with all the details specified in the previous articles 3 and 4 are shown in the attached model. § Use of the Coat of arms Art. 18 State offices are obliged to place the State Coat of Arms on official documents, signs, seals and any other official item. The coat of arms in question is reproduced: a) on sign boards with all its colors b) on stamps, documents and all other items only in black, smooth or in relief and in small form. On the proposal of the Ministerial Council, no. 1272, dated 5 August 1929 DECREES: The approval and implementation of the Decree-law on the Coat of Arms and Flags of the State. Tirana, 8 August 1929. ZOG d. v.
Great Arms Lesser Arms	Great/lesser arms of the Kingdom of Albania (1939–1943); On 3 June 1939, his Majesty the King Emperor, surrounded by his civil and military entourage, placed the «Constitutional Charter» into the hands of the President of the Ministerial Council, Vërlaci, expressing the paternal solicitude and affection for the Albanian people which inspired his determination. The said "Charter", made up of 54 articles grouped into 7 Titles, makes no mention yet of a coat of arms. The arms of the Kingdom of Albania were promulgated by royal decree nr. 141, dated 28 September 1939. Summarized in seven article paragraphs, they are described as follows: "The Greater arms of State is formed by a shield (scudo), red in color and with the black two headed eagle crowned by Skanderbeg's helm. Bearings: two Lictor fasces supported by axes pointing outwards, bound by leather straps, attached above by the Savoy knots, below by a scroll ribbon, of light blue color, gilded, charged with the word FERT, repeated three times. And the whole placed on a layer of red silk surrounded by fringes, woven of gold, decorated with ermine, crested by the Royal Crown of Savoy." The greater arms is used: in the great seal of the State, on solemn occasions and in monumental decorations. "The Lesser arms of State is formed by a shield (scudo), red in color and with the black two headed eagle crowned by Skanderbeg's helm. Bearings: two Lictor fasces supported by axes pointing outwards, bound by leather straps, attached above by the Savoy knots, below by a scroll ribbon, of light blue color, gilded, charged with the word "Fert", repeated three times. The shield is crested by the Royal Crown of Savoy." The lesser arms is used by the state administration.
	State emblem of People's Socialist Republic of Albania (1946–1992); Article 95 of the Statute of the People's Republic of Albania (1946) describes the state emblem as follows: "The national emblem of the People's Republic of Albania represents a field wrapped by two sheaves of ears of wheat. The sheaf of wheat is bound at the lower end with a ribbon which bears the inscription of the date 24 Maj 1944. A five-pointed red star stands among the tops of the tufts of the ears of wheat. A black double-headed eagle stands in the center of the field." Article 107 of the Constitution of the People's Socialist Republic of Albania (1976) maintains the same design phraseology as its precursor although expressed in a whole condensed sentence: "The emblem of the People's Socialist Republic of Albania bears a black, double-headed eagle, encircled by two sheaves of wheat with a five-pointed red star at the top and tied at the bottom with a red ribbon, on which the date »24 Maj 1944« is inscribed." Designed by acclaimed painter Sadik Kaceli, the emblem was initially adopted on 14 March 1946. It was readopted with minor amendments on 28 December 1976. The shapes of the emblem have undergone several changes over the decades. The officially accepted model, which has been used in banknotes and fiscal stamps since 1947, was published by the political and informative review "Albania today", in its 1st issue (32) of the 7th annual edition (1977).
	Coat of arms of the Republic of Albania (1992–1998); On 7 April 1992, the Assembly formed after the early elections, in its afternoon session, voted to remove the communist emblem as the official symbol of the state including the removal of the star from the country's flag and established a parliamentary commission tasked with studying the proposal of a new emblem of the state. During the plenary session of 13 November 1992, under proposal was the amendment of law no. 7491, dated 25.04.1991, "On the Main Constitutional Provisions" which propagated the inclusion of a new chapter titled "Flag, Coat of Arms and The Capital". Article 3 of the chapter, as read by the secretary of the assembly, stated the following: "The coat of arms of the Republic of Albania displays a black double-headed eagle placed on an escutcheon, a varriated type shield in red color. The shield is to have a straight line on top, that comes narrowing at the bottom. On top of the shield are written the words: Republika e Shqipërisë". — Law no. 7491, dated 25.04.1991, Article 3: "§ Flag, Coat of Arms and The Capital" After several discussions and with no objections, the chairman of the assembly Pjetër Arbnori took the microphone to announce that article 3 was approved unanimously. The image of the coat of arms is found in various documents of the state archive and was once suspended at the main curtain wall in front of the rostrum of the national assembly.

== See also ==
- Flag of Albania (List)
