= List of flags of Kosovo =

The following is a list of flags used in Kosovo.

== Republic of Kosovo ==
=== State flag ===
Flag	Date	Use	Description
	2008–present	National flag	Blue with six white stars in an arc above a gold-colored map of Kosovo in the center. Dimensions: 5:7

=== Government flags ===
Flag	Date	Use	Description
	1999–present	Flag of the Kosovo Police	White with two blue stripes, and a yellow-blue emblem of the KP in the centre. Dimensions: 2:3.
	2001–present	Presidential standard	Flag based on Ibrahim Rugova's "Dardania" flag proposal. Features the eagle of the flag of Albania. Dimensions: 2:3

=== Armed forces flags ===
Flag	Date	Use	Description
	2009–present	Flag of the Kosovo Security Force	Red field, with the KSF emblem featuring an eagle and six stars. Dimensions: 2:3.

== Ethnic flags ==
Flag	Date	Use	Description
	1960s–present	Flag of Albania used by Kosovo Albanians	A red field charged with a double-headed eagle. Dimensions: 2:3
	2010–present	Flag of Serbia used by Kosovo Serbs	A horizontal tricolour of red, blue, and white; charged with the lesser coat of arms towards the hoist of center. Dimensions: 2:3
	2008–present	Former Flag of Bosnia and Herzegovina used by Kosovo Bosniaks	A blue escutcheon charged with a white bend between six gold fleurs-de-lis displayed on a white field. Dimensions: 1:2
	2008–present	Flag of Turkey used by Kosovo Turks	A red field with a white star and crescent towards the hoist of center. Dimensions: 2:3
	2008–present	Romani Flag used by Romani people in Kosovo	The flag consists of a background of blue and green, representing the heavens and earth, respectively; it also contains a 16-spoke red dharmachakra, or cartwheel, in the center. Dimensions: 2:3
	2008–present	Flag used by Ashkali people in Kosovo	A horizontally divided green-white-red flag with a golden eagle in the center. Dimensions: 1:2

== Municipal flags ==
The "Law on use of State Symbols of Kosovo" grants the municipalities of Kosovo the right to adopt and use their own distinctive flags.

Flag	Date	Use	Description
		Flag of Deçan Municipality	White with the emblem of Deçan in the centre and the name of the municipality in Albanian below.
		Flag of Drenas Municipality	White with the emblem of Drenas in the centre.
		Flag of Ferizaj Municipality	White with the emblem of Ferizaj in the centre.
		Flag of Fushë Kosova / Kosovo Polje Municipality	White with the emblem of Fushë Kosova in the centre.
		Flag of Gjakova Municipality	White with the emblem of Gjakova in the centre.
		Flag of Gjilan Municipality	White with the emblem of Gjilan in the centre with the date "1600" above and the name of the municipality in Albanian below.
		Flag of Gračanica Municipality	Dark blue with the emblem of Gračanica in the centre.
		Flag of Hani i Elezit Municipality	Red with the emblem of Hani i Elezit in the centre.
		Flag of Istog Municipality	White with the emblem of Istog in the centre with the name of the municipality written below in Albanian.
		Flag of Kaçanik Municipality	Grey with the emblem of Kaçanik in the centre with the name of the municipality written above in Albanian.
		Flag of Kamenica Municipality	White with the emblem of Kamenica in the centre with the name of the municipality written above in Albanian and Serbian in the Latin script below.
		Flag of Klina Municipality	White with the emblem of Klina in the centre.
		Flag of Klokot Municipality	White with the emblem of Klokot in the centre.
		Flag of Lipjan Municipality	White with the coat of arms of Lipjan in the centre.
		Flag of Malisheva Municipality	White with the coat of arms of Malisheva in the centre with the name of the municipality written below in Albanian and Engliah.
		Flag of Obiliq Municipality	White with the emblem of Obiliq in the centre and the name of the municipality written below in Albanian, Serbian (Latin script) and English.
		Flag of Parteš Municipality	Dark blue with the emblem of Parteš in the centre.
		Flag of Peja Municipality	White with the emblem of Pristina in the centre and the name of the municipality written below in Albanian.
		Flag of Pristina Municipality	Light blue with the emblem of Pristina in the centre. The emblem features a statuette known as Goddess on the Throne.
		Flag of Prizren Municipality	White with the emblem of Prizren in the centre. The emblem features the House of the League of Prizren.
		Flag of Podujevo Municipality	White with the emblem of Podujevë in the centre and the name written below in Albanian. The emblem depicts the Orpheus mosaic found in the Dardanian city of Vendenis.
		Flag of Rahovec Municipality	White with the emblem of Rahovec in the centre and the name of the municipality in Albanian below. The emblem depicts the Rahovec Clocktower and bunches of grapes.
		Flag of Shtime Municipality	White with the emblem of Shtime in the centre.
		Flag of Skenderaj Municipality	White with the emblem of Skenderaj in the centre.
		Flag of Štrpce Municipality	Light blue with the emblem of Štrpce in the centre.
		Flag of Suva Reka Municipality	Banner of the arms of Suva Reka Municipality.
		Flag of Viti Municipality	White with the emblem of Vitina in the centre.
		Flag of Vushtrri Municipality	Light blue with the emblem of Vushtrri in the centre with the Latin name of the municipality written above.

== Political parties' flags ==
Flag	Date	Use	Description
		Flag of Vetëvendosje	Red with the motto of the party Vetëvendosje (Self Determination).
		Flag of Democratic Party of Kosovo	White with the logo of the Democratic Party of Kosovo.
		Flag of Democratic League of Kosovo	White with the logo of the Democratic League of Kosovo.
		Flag of Alliance for the Future of Kosovo	White with the logo of the Alliance for the Future of Kosovo.
		Flag of Social Democratic Initiative	Purple with the four letters of the party NISMA.

== Historical flags ==
=== Flags used in Kosovo under UN administration ===
Flag	Date	Use	Description
	1999–2008	Flag of the United Nations	The flag of the United Nations was used for official and government purposes in United Nations Administered Kosovo between 10 June 1999 and 17 February 2008.
	2003–2008	Flag of the Kosovo Olympic Committee	An outline map of Kosovo containing the emblem of UN administered Kosovo, the Olympic rings, a pictogram of an athlete and the name KOSOVË.
	1999–2009	Kosovo Protection Corps	Red with the emblem of the KPC in the centre. Dimensions: 2:3.
	1999–present	Kosovo Force	Blue with the emblem of KFOR in the centre.

=== Flags used in Kosovo as part of Yugoslavia and Serbia ===
Flag	Date	Use	Description
	1946–1992	Flag of SFR Yugoslavia	A horizontal tricolour of blue, white, and red; charged with a red star. Dimensions: 1:2
	1992–1999	Flag of FR Yugoslavia	A horizontal tricolour of blue, white, and red. Dimensions: 1:2
	1947–1992	Flag of SR Serbia	A horizontal tricolour of red, blue, and white; charged with a red star. Dimensions: 1:2
	1992–1999	Flag of the Republic of Serbia	A horizontal tricolour of red, blue, and white. Dimensions: 1:2

==== Ethnic Albanian flags in Kosovo during Yugoslavia ====
Flag	Date	Use	Description
	c.1918	National Defence of Kosovo	The flag was used by Committee "National Defence of Kosovo"
	c.1950–c.1990	Albanian minority flag	The flag was the official flag of the Albanian ethnic minority of Socialist Yugoslavia from the late 1940s to the late 1980s
	c.1991	Demonstrations flag	The flag used by the Albanian ethnic minority of Socialist Yugoslavia in 1991 during Demonstrations

== Flag proposals ==
Flag	Date	Use	Description
	Never used	State flag	"Competition Candidate 1" Dimensions: 2:3. Winning proposal and inspiration for the current flag.
	Never used	State flag	"Competition Candidate 2". Dimensions: 2:3
	Never used	State flag	"Competition Candidate 3". Dimensions: 2:3
	Never used	State flag	Joseph J. DioGuardi's proposal for a new flag for Kosovo based on the Albanian and US flags. Dimensions: 2:3
	Never used	State flag	A Dutch proposal for a flag for Kosovo based on shared symbolism. Dimensions: 2:3

== See also ==
- Flag of Albania (List)
- Emblem of Kosovo (Armorial)
- Coat of arms of Albania (Armorial)
- Albanian heraldry
