= Flag of Kosovo =

Republic of Kosovo
- Use: National flag
- Proportion: 5:7 (16:23 for table flag)
- Adopted: 17 February 2008; 18 years ago
- Design: A blue field charged with a map of Kosovo in gold, surmounted by an arc of six white five-pointed stars.
- Designed by: Muhamer Ibrahimi

The flag of the Republic of Kosovo (Note: Albanian: Flamuri i Republikës së Kosovës; Serbian: Застава Републике Косово / Zastava Republike Kosovo) was adopted by the Assembly of the Republic of Kosovo immediately following the unilateral declaration of independence of Kosovo on 17 February 2008. The flag design emerged from an international competition, organized by an informal group from the Provisional Institutions of Self-Government known as the Kosovo Unity Team, which attracted almost one thousand entries. The winning design was proposed by Muhamer Ibrahimi. It shows six white stars in an arc above a golden map of Kosovo, all on a blue field. The stars symbolize Kosovo's six major ethnic groups: Albanians, Serbs, Bosniaks, Turks, Romani, and Gorani.

Before the declaration of independence, Kosovo had come under the administration of the United Nations and used the UN flag for official purposes. The Serb and Albanian populations had used their own national flags since the 1945–1992 Socialist Yugoslavia period. Ethnic Serbs used a red, blue and white tricolor, which also forms the basis of the flag of Serbia. The ethnic Albanian population have used the flag of Albania since the 1960s as their ethnic flag. Both these flags can still be seen in use within Kosovo.

Serbia has not recognized the independence of Kosovo and continues to claim it as the Autonomous Province of Kosovo and Metohija. Unlike the case of the autonomous province of Vojvodina, the Serbian authorities have not adopted a unique flag to represent this claimed province, using the flag of Serbia instead.

== Design and use ==
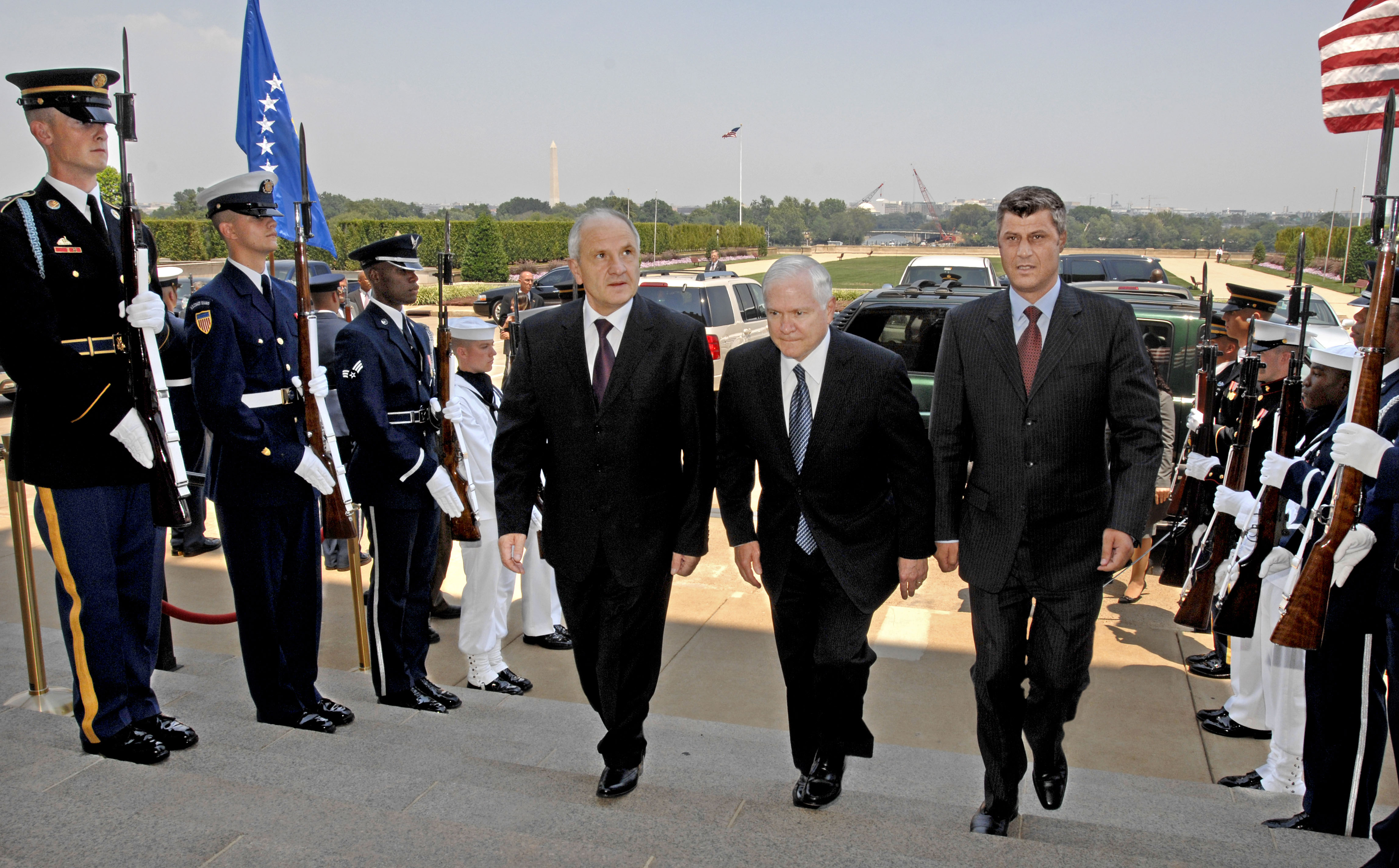
The Kosovar flag flying at the Pentagon on 18 July 2008.

The flag of Kosovo has a blue background, charged with a map of Kosovo and six stars. The stars are officially meant to symbolize Kosovo's six major ethnic groups: Albanians, Serbs, Bosniaks, Turks, Romani (often grouped with the Ashkali and Egyptians) and Gorani. Unofficially, the stars are sometimes said to represent the six regions, which according to Albanian ultra-nationalist ideology, make up Greater Albania: Albania, Kosovo, western parts of North Macedonia, parts of northern Greece, parts of Montenegro and Preševo Valley in southern Serbia. The flag bears a similarity to the emblem adopted in 2003 for use by government institutions in Kosovo, which also depicted a golden map of Kosovo on a blue field surmounted by stars. The flag of Kosovo resembles that of Bosnia and Herzegovina in terms of colors and shapes used (white stars and yellow shape of the country on a blue field). The flag is unusual among national flags in using a map as a design element; the flag of Cyprus is the only other to do so. The ratio of the flag was announced during the contest as 2:3; with the passage of a diplomatic protocol law in Kosovo in April 2009, the ratio was set as 1:1.4 (5:7 when put in whole numbers). The colors and construction of the Kosovo flag have not yet been defined; however, an official government document does give the colors of the flag using CMYK. The unofficial RGB values of the flag have been manually extracted since 2009. The use of the Kosovo flag is regulated by the law: "Law on the Use of Kosovo State Symbols". The Serbian government initially objected to the use of the Kosovo flag at international meetings and gatherings, but agreed to recognize Kosovo's national symbols in 2023 under the terms of the Ohrid Agreement.

=== Colours and sizes ===
System	Blue	Gold	White
CMYK (Government)	100-80-0-0	0-20-60-20	0-0-0-0
Hexadecimal (Government)	#2443A5	#D1A650	#FFF546
Hexadecimal	#183884	#DBCB5B	#FFFFFF

Use	Length and width in centimeters
When used outdoors (pole is 10 meters tall and in the ground)	not exceeding 350 × 490
When used outdoors (pole is 10 meters tall and on a balcony)	200 × 280
When used indoors (pole is 2.5 meters tall)	107 × 150 or 150 × 210
Table flag	16 × 23

== Use of Albanian and Serbian flags in Kosovo ==
The Albanian flag remains popular with Kosovo Albanians.

Serbia does not recognize the 2008 secession of Kosovo and considers it a United Nations-governed entity within its sovereign territory, the Autonomous Province of Kosovo and Metohija, as defined by the 2006 Constitution of Serbia.

Even months after Kosovo's declaration of independence, the Serbian flag was still seen at official government buildings until officially replaced by the Kosovo government. Flags of Serbia, and Serbian Orthodox Church were used in protests against Kosovo independence and still can be seen in Serb-majority areas in the north.

However, a person was sentenced by a panel of EULEX judges on 19 November 2009, for inciting hatred by raising a Serbian flag on a mosque in the southern part of Mitrovica (among other charges of discord/intolerance and attempted aggravated murder of a police officer).

Flag of Albania often used by Kosovo Albanians

Flag of Serbia often used by Kosovo Serbs

== Historical flags ==
=== Kosovo in SFR Yugoslavia / Serbia and Montenegro ===
Until 1991, Kosovo did not have a flag of its own. However, during different periods of history, different flags were flown in Kosovo. Before 1969, the only flags that could legally fly over Kosovo (then an autonomous province) were those of SFR Yugoslavia and SR Serbia. If a nationalist flag were flown, such as Albanian, Serbian or Croatian, a person could go to prison for doing so.

In 1969, the Kosovar Albanian population was able to use a variant of the Albanian flag as its ethnic flag. However, the flag had to be charged with a red star, a symbol of socialism that was present on all Yugoslav flags. Even without this requirement, the flag of the People's Socialist Republic of Albania at the time had a red star, outlined in gold, above the double headed eagle. Later on, different nationalities in Kosovo could use their own national flags in accordance with legislation.

Before the death of Yugoslav leader Josip Broz Tito and the breakup of SFR Yugoslavia, there were calls for the Albanian flag to be banned because Kosovo Serbs did not want to live under a foreign flag. This sentiment culminated in the September 1985's "Petition of the 2016" (the number of Kosovo Serbs who organised it), which called for, among other items, a greater statehood status for Serbia and the removal of all Albanian symbols. The Serbian side also began to remove the red star from the Yugoslav flag, using it for protests to counterbalance the Albanian population and to promote a Greater Serbia.

Flag of Kosovo used by Committee "National Defence of Kosovo" 1918.

Flag of SFR Yugoslavia (1946–1992)

Flag of Serbia and Montenegro (1992–2006)

Flag of SR Serbia (1947–1992)

Flag of Serbia (1992–2004)

Flag of Serbia (2004–2010)

Flag of Albanian minority in SFR Yugoslavia

Flag of the League of Communists of Kosovo

=== Republic of Kosova ===
Flag of the Republic of Kosova (1991-1999)

The flag of the former Republic of Kosova (1991–2000) consists of a red flag with a black double-headed eagle centered in the hoist half, similar to the flag of Albania. After the adoption of United Nations Security Council Resolution 1244 and the creation of the United Nations Interim Administration Mission in Kosovo (UNMIK) in June 1999, the flag and the Republic of Kosova were both abolished.

The flag was adopted by the Republic of Kosova in 1991 as a variation of the Albanian flag and used throughout the country. In June 1999, with the passing of Resolution 1244 and the establishment of UNMIK, the Republic of Kosova ceased to exist along with the flag. The flag had little to no recognition when it was used, only being seen in referendums, general elections and TV reports.

When UNMIK was established, the flag was seen up until 2000, when it was replaced with the Albanian flag. In the Preševo Valley, the flag was used during the insurgency until 2001, when the Yugoslav Army took back the Ground Safety Zone and occupied areas by the Liberation Army of Preševo, Medveđa and Bujanovac (UÇPMB).

=== Kosovo under United Nations administration ===
When Kosovo was under the administration of the United Nations Interim Administration Mission in Kosovo (UNMIK), the UN flag was flown in Kosovo for official purposes. The Constitutional Framework for Self Government in Kosovo, promulgated in May 2001, allowed institutions to use approved symbols if authorized by UNMIK. Specific flags and emblems were authorized for used by the Kosovo Police Service, Kosovo Protection Corps and the Provisional Institutions of Self-Government. Some municipalities in Kosovo also adopted official symbols during the period of administration by UNMIK. The NATO-led international peacekeeping force in Kosovo, KFOR, also used a distinctive flag during this period.

However, many Kosovo Albanians usually used the Albanian flag. The Albanian flag was also used on public buildings, even though it was against UN regulations. Regulations stated only the UN flag and other authorized flags, like those of institutions and cities, could fly on public buildings. If the Albanian flag was flown, then the Serbian flag was to have been flown too, according to these regulations. However, this was rarely done in practice and the flag of Albania was ever-present in Kosovo during the UNMIK period.

Prior to the declaration of independence, Kosovo used a flag featuring a map of Kosovo against a blue background, similar to the flag of Bosnia and Herzegovina and the flag of Cyprus.

Flag of the United Nations used in Kosovo between 1999 and 2008

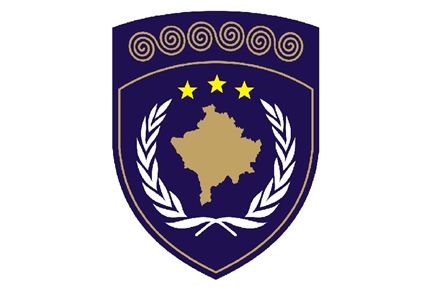
The Emblem of Kosovo during UN administration also depicted a golden map of Kosovo surmounted by stars on a blue field

Flag of the Kosovo Police Service

Flag of the Kosovo Protection Corps

Flag of the Olympic Committee of Kosovo (2003–2008)

Flag of the KFOR peacekeeping force

=== Competition for a new flag ===
A competition for a new flag, held in June 2007, received 993 entries. Under the terms of UN talks, all such symbols would have to reflect the multi-ethnic nature of Kosovo, avoiding the use of the Albanian or Serbian double-headed eagles or the use of solely red and black or red, blue and white color schemes. Red and black are the colors used on the Albanian flag; red, blue and white are the main colors used on the Serbian flag. Additionally, all entries had to be rectangular and have a 2:3 proportion. The Kosovo Symbols Commission eventually selected three designs, which were then voted on by the Assembly of Kosovo (with a two-thirds majority required for approval), when independence was declared after the status talks. The three proposals selected were forwarded to the Assembly on 4 February 2008.

=== The proposals and final choice ===
- Blue field with a white map of Kosovo surrounded by five stars. The stars vary in size and represent the different ethnic groups that reside in Kosovo. The largest star would represent ethnic Albanians.
- A vertical tricolour of black, white and red.
- A vertical tricolour of black, white and red with a spiral (Dardanian symbol of the rotating Sun) in the center of the white stripe.

Representatives of the people of Kosovo voted on 17 February 2008 to use a variant of the first proposal. The modified version has an additional star, makes the stars equal in size, switches the colors of the stars and map, makes the map bigger, and arranges the stars in a curve above the map.

Competition proposal 1

Competition proposal 2

Competition proposal 3

=== Other proposals ===
The "Flag of Dardania"

Ibrahim Rugova, the first president of Kosovo, introduced the "flag of Dardania" on October 29, 2000. The flag was blue, inscribed with a red disc with a golden ring. Inside the red disc is the Albanian eagle. The eagle is holding a ribbon with the legend "Dardania" inscribed. This flag did not gain much popularity; Dardania is the name of an ancient region in the same general area as Kosovo. It was occasionally used at cultural and sports events during the UNMIK period and was also used at Rugova's funeral to cover his coffin. It was used as a presidential standard and by the two Rugovan political parties, the Democratic League of Kosovo and the Democratic League of Dardania. The flag of Dardania is shown as the Presidential Flag on the Kosovo presidency website, making it official. Since the election of Vjosa Osmani as the President of Kosovo, the Dardania Flag has again featured heavily in the institution of the presidency.

== See also ==
- List of flags of Kosovo
- Emblem of Kosovo (Armorial)
- Anthem of the Republic of Kosovo
- National symbols of Kosovo
