= Dhimitër Beratti =

Albanian politician and journalist

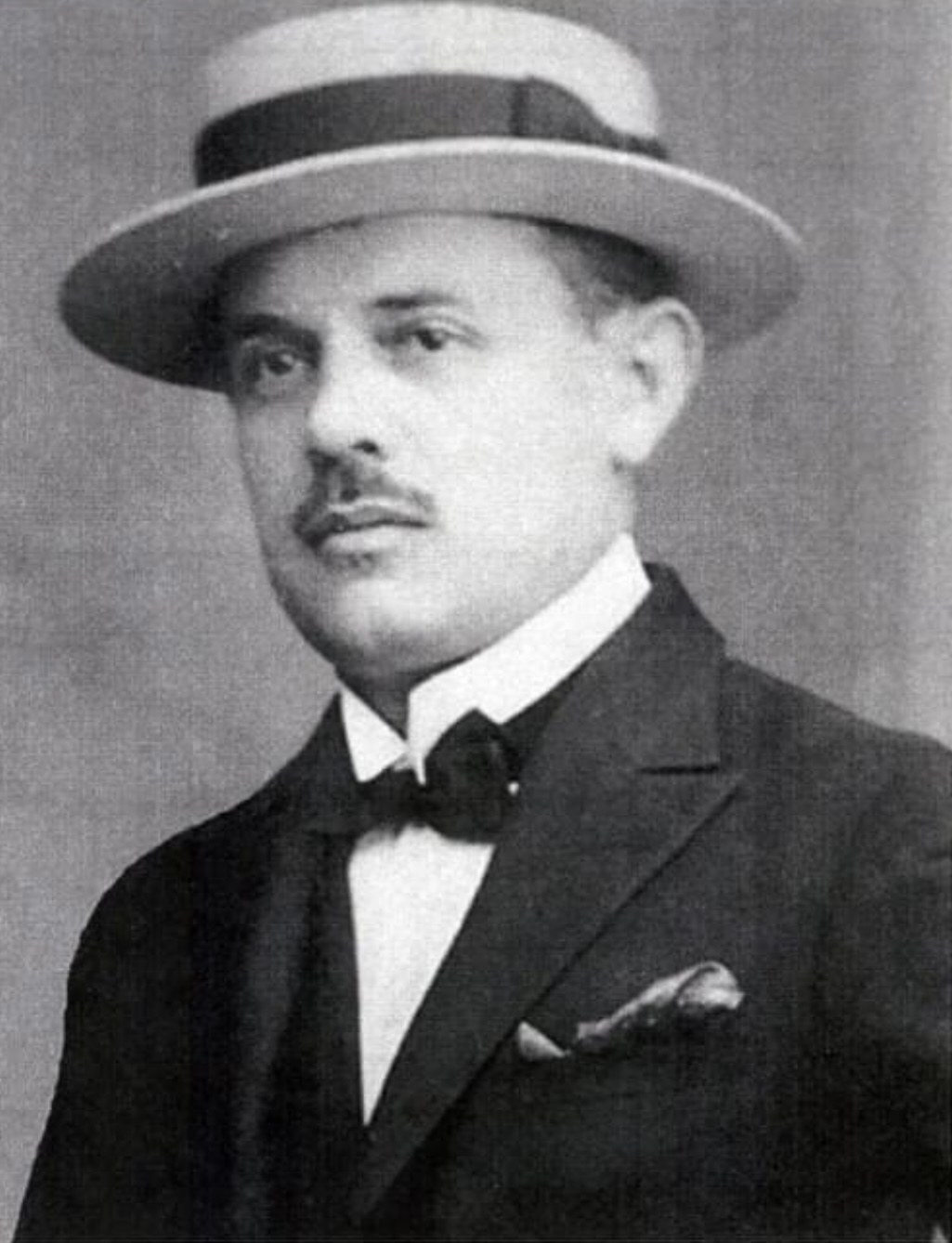
- Born: October 15, 1886; Korçë, Manastir Vilayet, Ottoman Empire (now Albania)
- Died: September 8, 1970 (aged 83); Rome, Italy
- Other names: Dhimitër Beratti
- Occupations: Politician, publisher, writer
- Known for: Albanian Declaration of Independence

Dhimitër Beratti or Berati (15 October 1886^{[a]} – 8 September 1970) was an Albanian politician, journalist, one of the signatories of the Albanian Declaration of Independence and the secretary of the Albanian delegation at the Paris Peace Conference, 1919.

== Life ==
Born in Korçë on 15 October 1888, his parents have their origins from Berat. He studied at the law and political science of the University of Bucharest. In 1905 he returned to his home town where he worked in the first Albanian school established there. In 1908 he was one of the founding members of the Dituria ("Knowledge") association of Korçë.
In 1909 participates as a suffler in the Besa theatrical play, one of the first in Albania. The same year he participates in the Congress of Elbasan (related to education in Albanian) and one year later in the Second Congress of Monastir.
Participant in the meeting at Hotel Continental in Bucharest, Romania where the Albanian colony for electing the delegation to the Vlora event of 1912. He signed the Albanian Declaration of Independence act on 28 November 1912 as D.Beratti on behalf of the Albanian Colony of Bucharest. Beratti was elected general director of the Perlindja e Shqipëniës newspaper. He participated in the Albanian delegation to London in 1913, following up with the Conference of Ambassadors. Later in 1913 elected general director of the hospitals in Albania. Participated as secretary of the Albanian delegation in the Paris Peace Conference of 1919, staying mainly there until 1921. During this period he published two books Albania and the Albanians (Paris, 1920) and La question Albanaise (Paris, 1920).

In 1923 he was engaged again by the Ministry of Foreign Affairs in Albania, assigned to the International Border Commission. Beratti was elected General Counsel of Albania in Sofia, Kingdom of Bulgaria in 1924, returning to Albania in 1926 where he worked as a secretary in the Ministry of Foreign Affairs. In 1935 he was elected Minister of the National Economy. In 1936 he was sent as an Albanian Minister in Rome, Italy. On 3 December 1941, he was elected as a secretary in the Ministry of Popular Culture in the pro-Italian government of Mustafa Merlika-Kruja. After the fall of Rexhep Mitrovica's government, he left Albania and settled in Rome where he lived for the rest of his life. He died in Rome on 6 September 1970, possibly in a traffic accident.

== Orders and decorations ==
- Grand Cordon of Order of the Crown of Romania.
- Grand Cross of the Order of the White Lion (1939).

== Notes ==
a.	Elsie by mistake places 1896 as year of birth; if so, he would have been 16 years old in the Vlora event of 1912.
