= Emblem of Kosovo =

Emblem of the Republic of Kosovo
- Armiger: Republic of Kosovo
- Adopted: 17 February 2008; 18 years ago

The Emblem of the Republic of Kosovo was introduced following the declaration of independence on 17 February 2008. It shows six white stars in an arc above a solid golden shape of Kosovo as seen on a standard projection map, placed on a rounded triangular shield with a blue field and a golden border. Its central figures, the stars and the shape, are also the content of the new blue flag of Kosovo, adopted at the same time. A golden map of Kosovo on a blue field surmounted by stars were also featured on the emblem used when Kosovo was administered by the United Nations.

Serbia has not recognized the independence of Kosovo and continues to claim it as the Autonomous Province of Kosovo and Metohija. Unlike the case of the autonomous province of Vojvodina, the Serbian authorities have not adopted a unique coat of arms to represent this claimed province, using the coat of arms of Serbia instead.

== Government emblems ==
Some of the institutions of Kosovo have adopted their own distinct emblems to represent themselves.

Emblem used by the President of Kosovo

Emblem of the Constitutional Court of Kosovo

== History ==
=== Symbols used in Kosovo during United Nations administration ===
The Constitutional Charter for Provisional Self-Government in Kosovo, promulgated by United Nations Mission in Kosovo (UNMIK) in May 2001, gave the institutions of Kosovo the right to use symbols in accordance with UNMIK legislation.

An emblem for Kosovo, to be used by the Provisional Institutions of Self-Government, was adopted in 2003. The emblem depicted a map of Kosovo in gold on a blue background surrounded by two olive branches, in the style of those found used in the emblem of the United Nations, above which were three gold stars and three double spirals ornamentation which is a traditional symbol of ancient Dardania and represents the rotating Sun.

During the period of administration by UNMIK, two regulations relating to the use of symbols were made:

- UNMIK regulation UNMIK/REG/2000/30 (20 May 2000) "ON STAMPS AND HEADINGS OF OFFICIAL DOCUMENTS OF COURTS, PROSECUTORS’ OFFICES AND PENAL ESTABLISHMENTS" states that the stamps of courts and penal establishments should contain "The emblem of the United Nations with “UNMIK” added to the top of the emblem" and the word "“Kosovo” in Albanian, Serbian and English"
- ADMINISTRATIVE DIRECTION NO. 2003/15 (2 July 2003) "IMPLEMENTING UNMIK REGULATION NO. 2001/9 ON A CONSTITUTIONAL FRAMEWORK FOR PROVISIONAL SELF-GOVERNMENT IN KOSOVO" Establishes an approved logo for the Provisional Institutions of Self Government.
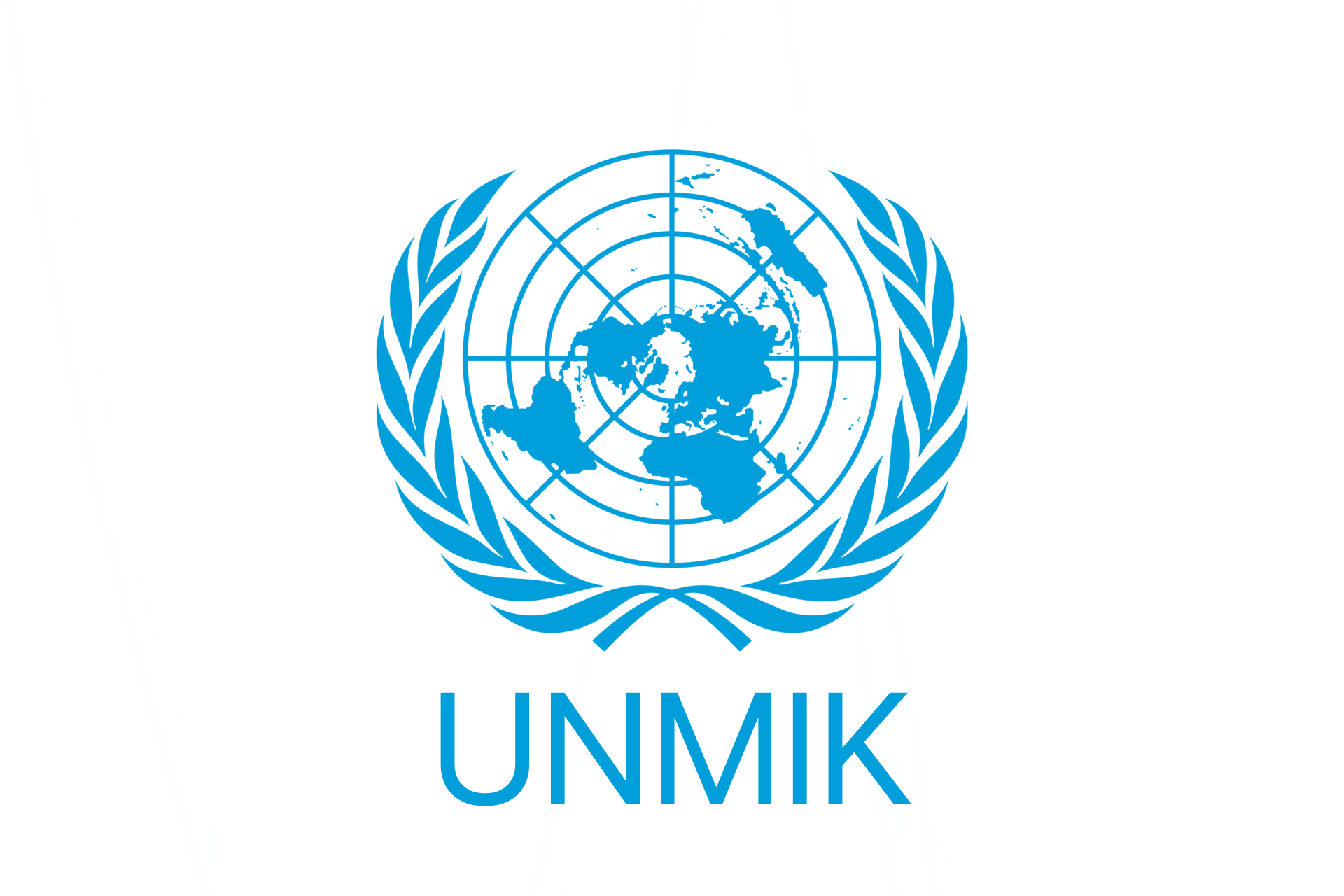
Emblem of the United Nations Mission in Kosovo

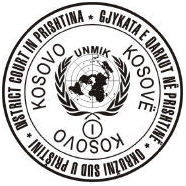
Example of an ink stamp used by public institutions in Kosovo during UN administration

Emblem used in United Nations Administered Kosovo

== Municipal emblems ==
The Municipalities of Kosovo have their own coats or arms, seals or emblems.

== See also ==
- Armorial of Kosovo
- Flag of Kosovo (List)
- Anthem of the Republic of Kosovo
- National symbols of Kosovo
