= Anthem of the Republic of Kosovo =

- National anthem of Kosovo
- Also known as: "Himni i Republikës së Kosovës", "Himna Republike Kosovo" "Evropa" (English: "Europe")
- Music: Mendi Mengjiqi, 2008
- Adopted: 11 June 2008; 18 years ago

U.S. Navy Band instrumental version

The first two lines played on piano

The Anthem of the Republic of Kosovo (Albanian: Himni i Republikës së Kosovës) was composed by Mendi Mengjiqi. As with the national anthems of Bosnia and Herzegovina, San Marino (until September 2025), and Spain, it has no official lyrics, but de facto lyrics are in use. It was adopted on 11 June 2008. It was chosen because it contained no references to any specific ethnic group. It was selected by the Assembly of the Republic of Kosovo, with 72 MPs voting in favor, while 15 voted against, and five abstained.

== History ==
On 12 March 2008, the Assembly of the Republic of Kosovo announced an open contest to choose a national anthem for the country in Pristina's newspapers and on the official website of the Assembly. The rules include:

- "Composition should be distinguishable: – should be unique and original"
- "Length of the composition should not last less than 30 seconds or more than 60 seconds."
- "Texts can be included as well in the application, in any official language of the Republic of Kosovo" however, the final adoption is believed not to include them. Choosing the text for the anthem would have been a difficult task because the majority of the population in Kosovo are Albanians, Serbs being the second largest ethnic group. The government has emphasised that no ethnic group should be discriminated against, declaring the state a "democratic, secular and multiethnic republic" thus making it difficult to find lyrics that do not favour one ethnic group over another one. Similar problems were encountered when choosing the flag. Furthermore, the rules also state that the proposal "Should not present or be similar to the hymn or popular song of any country, or hymn of any political party, movement or Institution of Republic of Kosovo, or to implicate any faithfulness towards any ethnic community of Republic of Kosovo."
- The proposals must be submitted by 31 March 2008.
- The composer of the adopted piece will be awarded €10,000 and two other qualified proposals will receive €7,000 and €5,000.

== De facto lyrics ==
Albanian (Gheg) original

O mëmëdhe i dashur, vend i trimnisë
Çerdhe e dashurisë
N`ty shqipet fluturojnë dhe yjet ndriçojnë
Vend i të parëve tonë

Ti qofsh bekue për jetë e mot
O nënë e jonë
Ne të dalim Zot

O mëmëdhe i dashur, vend i trimnisë
Çerdhe e dashurisë

IPA transcription (Note: See Help:IPA/Albanian and Albanian phonology.)

[ɔ mə.mə.ðɛ i da.ʃuɾ vɛnd i tɾim.nis(ə)]
[t͡ʃɛɾ.ðɛ‿ɛ da.ʃu.ɾis(ə)]
[nty ʃci.pɛt flu.tu.ɾɔjn ðɛ y.jɛt ndɾi.t͡ʃɔjn(ə)]
[vɛnd i‿t paɾ.vɛ tɔn]

[ti cɔfʒ‿bɛ.ku.ɛ pəɾ jɛt ɛ mɔt]
[ɔ nən ɛ jɔn]
[nɛ tə da.lim zɔt]

[ɔ mə.mə.ðɛ i da.ʃuɾ vɛnd i tɾim.nis(ə)]
[t͡ʃɛɾ.ðɛ‿ɛ da.ʃu.ɾis]

Serbian
Cyrillic
Latin

О, мила домовино, земљо храбрости
Гнездо љубави
Око тебе орлови лете и звезде сијају
Земљо наших предака

Буди благословена за живот и године
О, наша мајко
Ми ћемо те заштити

О, мила домовино, земљо храбрости
Гнездо љубави

O, mila domovino, zemljo hrabrosti
Gnezdo ljubavi
Oko tebe orlovi lete i zvezde sijaju
Zemljo naših predaka

Budi blagoslovena za život i godine
O, naša majko
Mi ćemo te zaštiti

O, mila domovino, zemljo hrabrosti
Gnezdo ljubavi

English translation

O beloved motherland, land of bravery
Nest of love
Over thee eagles fly and stars shine
Land of our ancestors

Be blessed for life and years
O our mother
We shall protect thee

O beloved motherland, land of bravery
Nest of love

== Other anthem candidates ==
=== Ode to Joy ===
"Ode to Joy", the European continental anthem, was played at the official declaration ceremonies of the Republic of Kosovo. The government of the Republic of Kosovo decided to do this as a mark of respect to the European Union for its efforts on helping in gaining independence. It remained in use as a de facto national anthem until the official anthem was adopted a few weeks later.

=== Himni i Flamurit ===
"Himni i Flamurit", the national anthem of Albania, has been widely used in Kosovo with other Albanian national symbols. It was also the state anthem of the unrecognized Republic of Kosova that existed from 1990 until 1999, when Kosovo was placed under the control of the United Nations.

=== Kur ka ra kushtrimi n'Kosovë ===
"Kur ka ra kushtrimi n'Kosovë", an Albanian language song composed by Rauf Dhomi, was unsuccessfully proposed for state anthem by former President of Kosovo Ibrahim Rugova in 2000.

== See also ==
- National symbols of Kosovo
