= Albanian heraldry =

Use of heraldic symbols in Albania

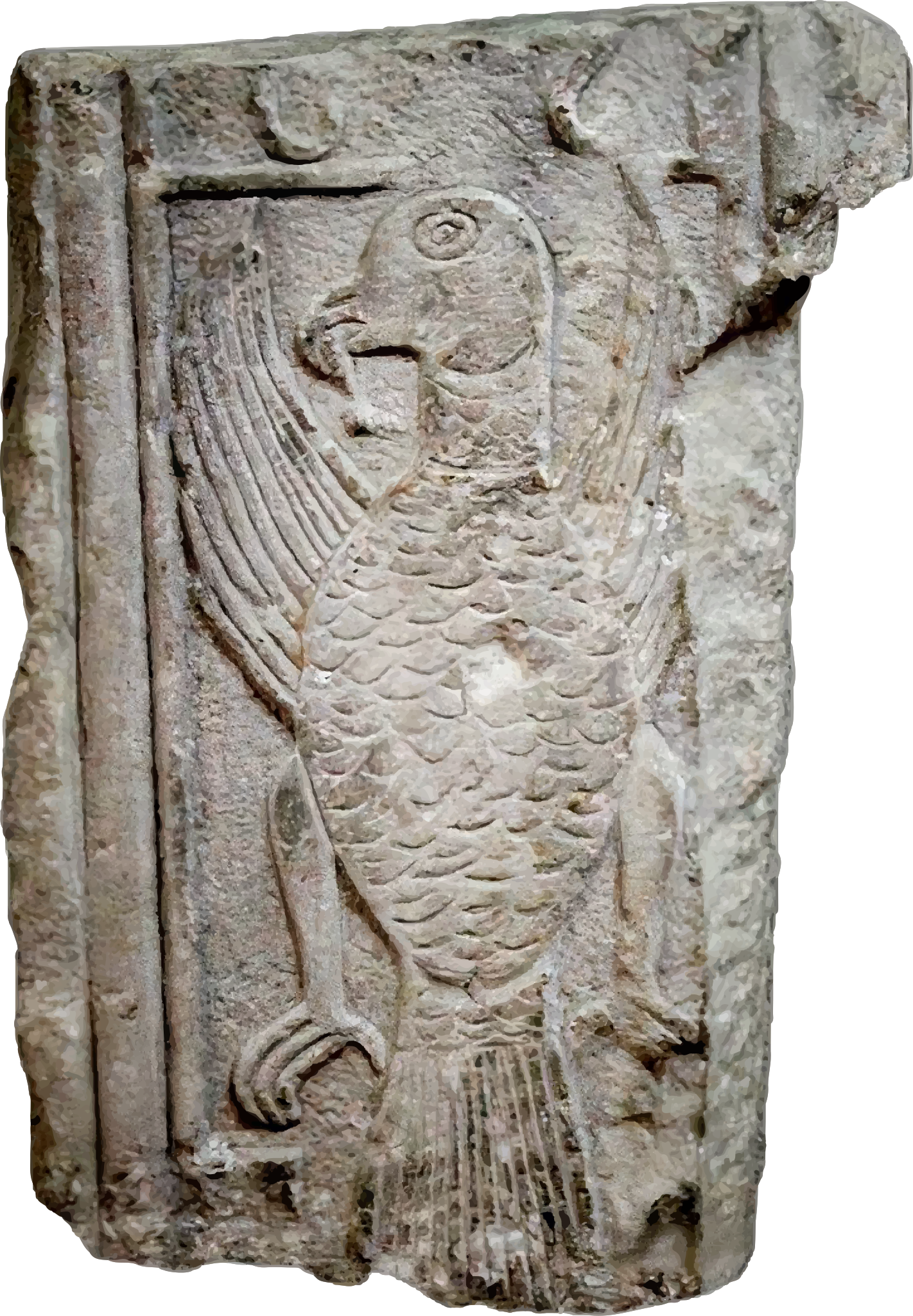
Coat of arms found at the abbey of Ndërfandina in Gëziq.

Heraldry, the art and science of armorial design, first emerged in Europe during the 11th century, born out of necessity on the battlefield. As armies grew in size and complexity, symbols painted on shields and banners became essential for identifying allies, enemies and military leaders alike. Over time, these symbols evolved from practical battlefield markers into convoluted expressions of lineage, authority and identity, giving rise to a codified system we now know as heraldry.

== Origins and development ==
The term “heraldry” originates from the figure of the herald, a court official tasked with overseeing the use of armorial symbols. Heralds maintained records of coats of arms, organized ceremonies and ensured that emblems adhered to established norms. In Albanian tradition, this figure is known as kasnec, a native term that underscores how deeply heraldry was embedded in local culture.

Changes in heraldic design often mirrored real-world shifts: territorial expansion or loss, vassalage, strategic marriages, political alliances and the division of noble families into distinct branches.

Scholar and albanologist Milan Šufflay notes that heraldry was used in Albanian ceremonies and chancelleries from a very early period, stimulated by interaction with French knights and nobility. In line with these customs, the Thopia and Balsa families had yielded their own standards and minted their own coins.

Andrea Thopia altered his family's arms after marrying into French royalty, incorporating the fleur-de-lis of the Angevin crown. The Muzaka, upon receiving the Byzantine title of despot, added the imperial double-headed eagle to their emblem, later including the six-pointed star of the Balsa, under whose domain they fell. A nephew of Skanderbeg, having risen to ecclesiastical rank, introduced the Christian triangle symbolizing the Holy Trinity into his inherited arms.

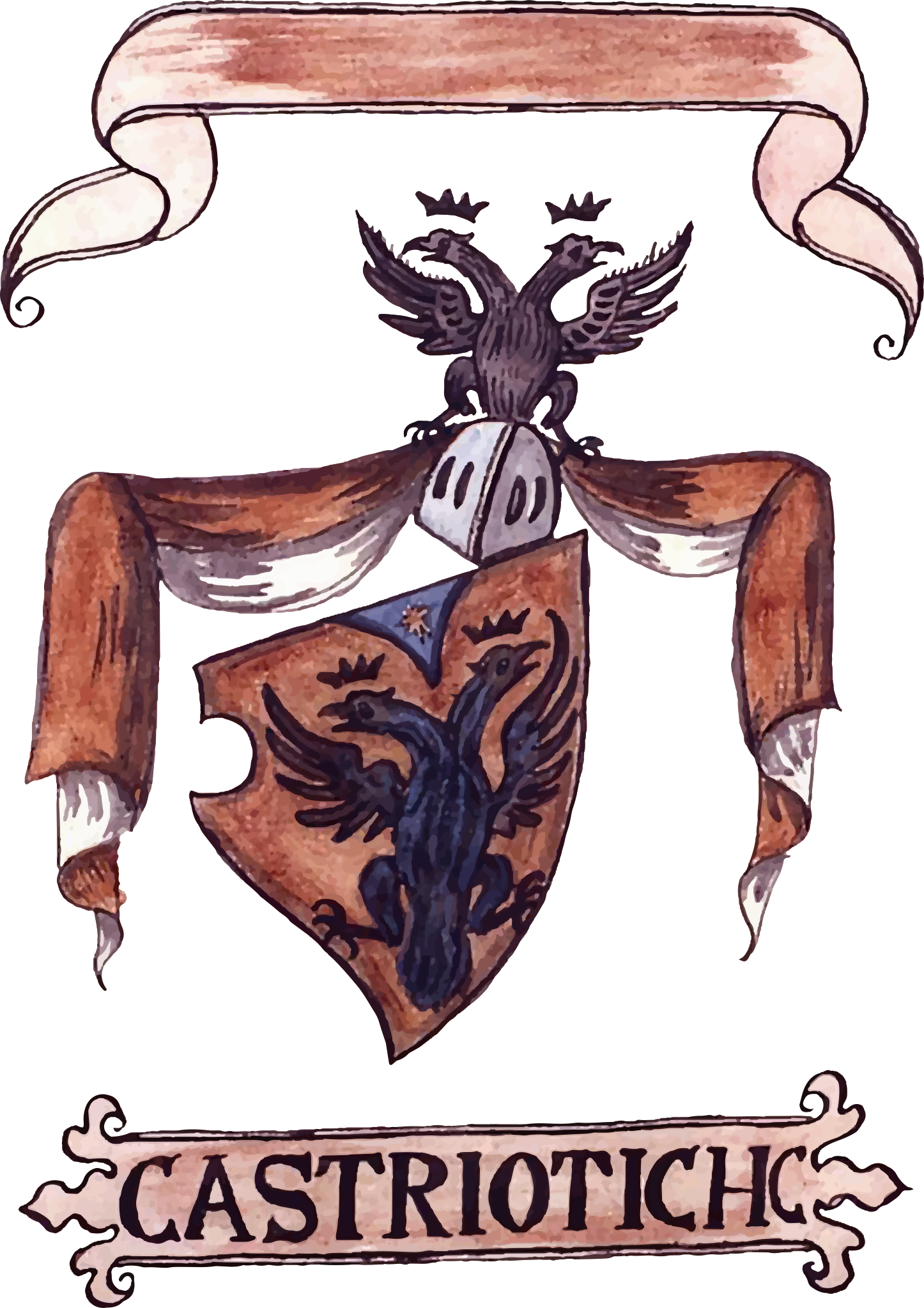
Coat of arms of the Kastrioti as depicted in the 17th century Fojnica Armorial.

By the late middle ages, heraldic composition had reached its artistic pinnacle. Originally limited to symbols on shields, heraldry expanded to include crests, helmets, mantling and supporters, forming the full coat of arms.

Albanian heraldry was not confined to aristocratic families. As towns grew in wealth and independence, guilds, religious communities and even artisan associations adopted their own emblems. Statutes and coats of arms existed for cities like Scutari, Alessio, Durazzo, Dulcigno, Drivasto and Zvaq. Trade guilds included the blacksmiths of Peja, tanners of Elbasan and weapon-makers of Hajmel.

Much of Albania's heraldic legacy was eventually forgotten, from centuries of occupation and conflict. Ottoman rule actively discouraged and suppressed the symbols of nobility, leading to the destruction of towns, fortresses and cultural monuments.

=== Heraldry in exile ===
The second chapter in Albanian heraldry unfolded during the 16th and 17th centuries, as many noble families sought refuge abroad.

Families like the Albani, Cocco, Durazzo, Giura and Zaguri rose to prominence within the Patrician class, amassing wealth and political influence. Others, such as the Petta, Macri, Boccali, Basta and Crescia distinguished themselves in military and administrative roles.

This noble heritage was also reflected in ecclesiastical heraldry. Bishops and clerics like Kostandin Kastrioti, Pjetër Bogdani and Nikollë Mekajshi wove ancestral symbols into their episcopal arms. Later families such as the Vulgari, Lapazaya and Parrino continued this tradition, often blending inherited Albanian motifs with new religious or academic elements.

=== Seals and national symbols ===
Heraldry extended beyond coats of arms and found wider use in seals, which served as necessary instruments of authority in the medieval world.

Surviving examples include those of Gjon Kastrioti and Strazimir Balsa, as well as documented references to civic seals, many of whom are nonexistent in visual form.

The seal of Skanderbeg, bearing the double-headed eagle, is significant as it inspired the current national symbol of Albania.

== See also ==
- Armorial of Albania
- Armorial of Kosovo
