= Perlindja e Shqipëniës =

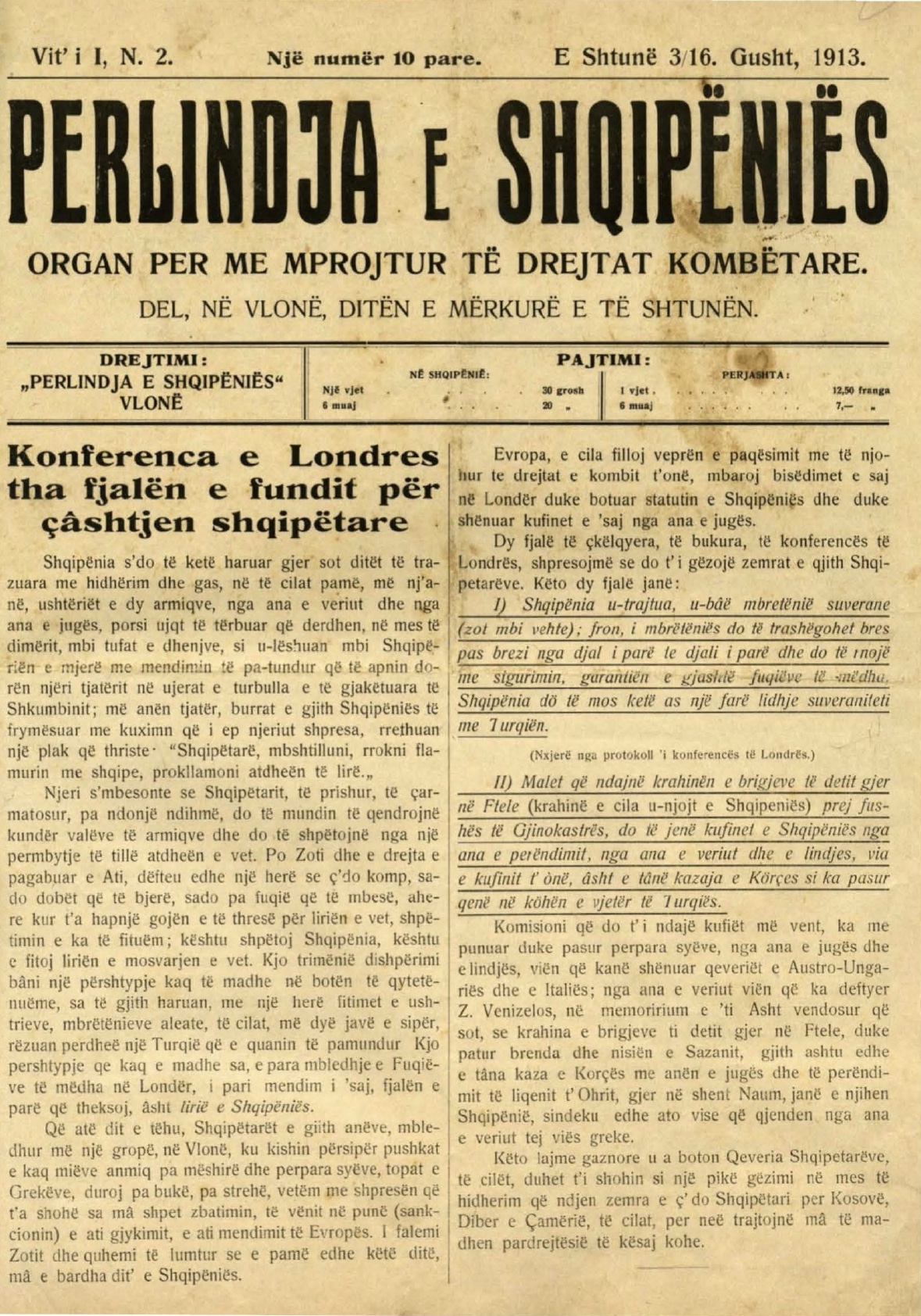
- Editor-in-chief: Dhimitër Beratti
- Founded: 24 August 1913
- Ceased publication: 28 March 1914
- Language: Albanian
- Headquarters: Vlorë, Albania

Perlindja e Shqipëniës (English: Rebirth of Albania) was the first newspaper published in Independent Albania. Its first issue was released on August 24, 1913, and its chief editor was Dhimitër Beratti, with publicist Mihal Grameno serving as contributing editor.

The newspaper was published twice a week and a total of 56 times until its last issue on March 28, 1914. In its articles, among other things, the paper called for the unification of the Albanian people to withstand the challenges of the time.
