= Armorial of Kosovo =

This is gallery of coats or arms, seals and emblems used by the institutions of Kosovo since 10 June 1999.

== National ==
Emblem of the Republic of Kosovo

=== Historical ===
Emblem of the Republic of Kosova (1991–2000)

Emblem used in United Nations Administered Kosovo (2003-2008)

== Governmental ==
Seal of the president of Kosovo

Emblem of the Constitutional Court of Kosovo

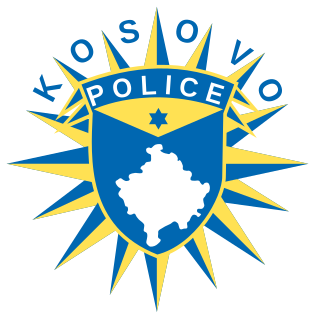
Emblem of the Kosovo Police

Emblem of the Basic Court of Pristina

Emblem of the State Prosecutor

Emblem of the Kosovo Prosecutorial Council

=== Historical ===
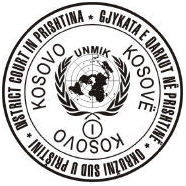
Example of an ink stamp used by public institutions in UN administered Kosovo (2000-2008)

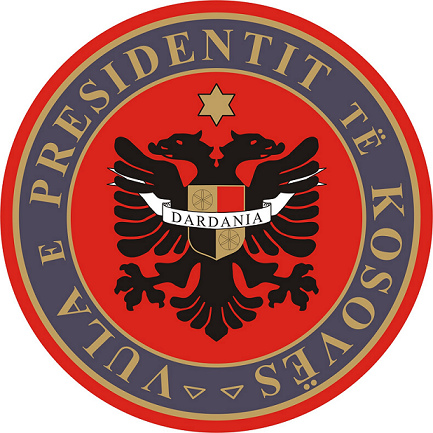
Former seal of the president of Kosovo (2001-2008)

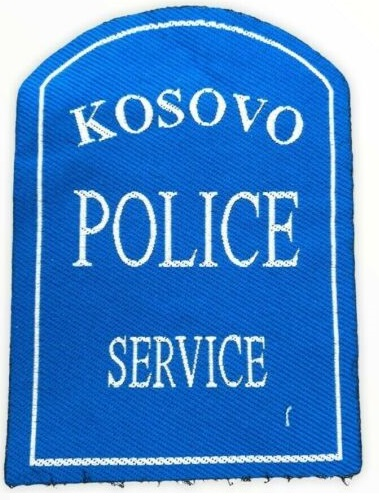
First emblem of the Kosovo Police Service

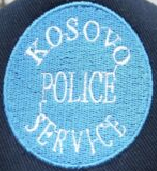
First cap badge of the Kosovo Police Service

== Military ==
Emblem of the Kosovo Security Force

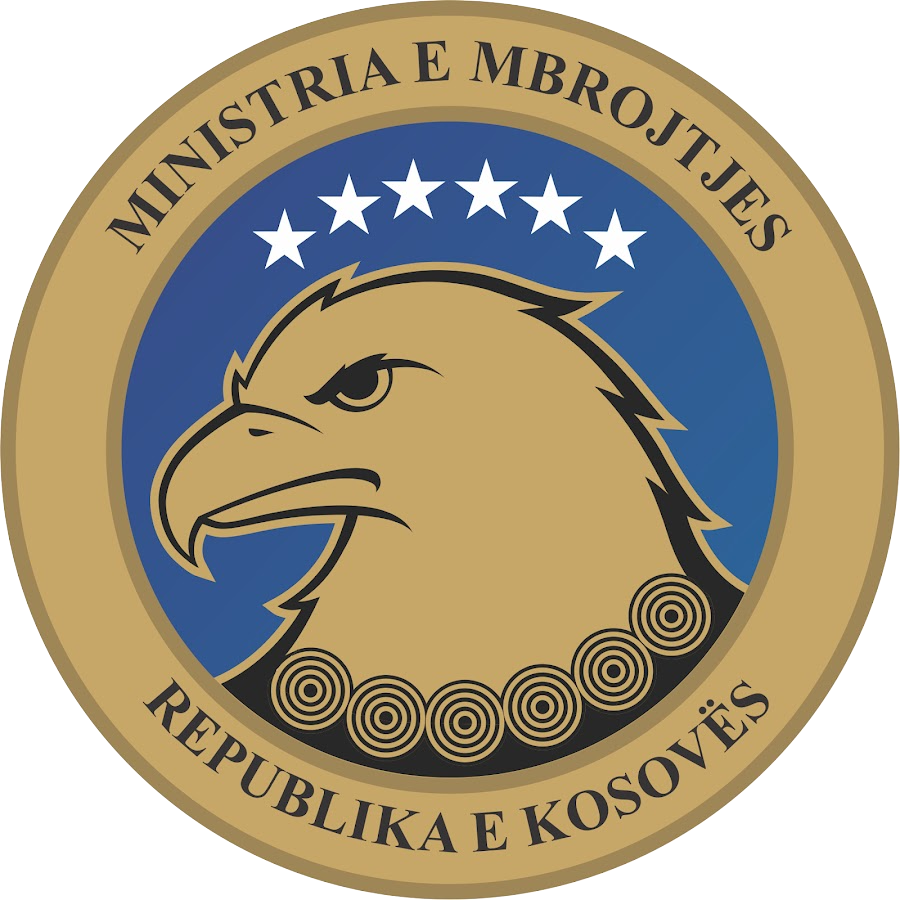
Seal of the Ministry of Defence

=== Historical ===
Emblem of the Kosovo Protection Corps

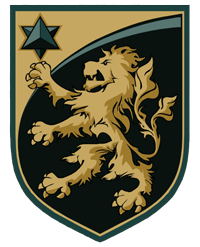
Former emblem of the Kosovo Security Force

== Municipal ==
The Municipalities of Kosovo have each adopted distinct coats or arms, seals or emblems.

=== District of Ferizaj ===
Ferizaj

Hani i Elezit

Kaçanik

Shtime

Štrpce

=== District of Gjakova ===
Deçan

Gjakova

Junik

Rahovec

=== District of Gjilan ===
Gjilan

Kamenica

Klokot

Parteš

Ranilug

Viti

=== District of Mitrovica ===
Leposavić

North Mitrovica

Skenderaj

South Mitrovica

Vushtrri

Zubin Potok

Zvečan

=== District of Peja ===
Peja

Istog

Klina

=== District of Pristina ===
Drenas

Kosovo Polje

Gračanica

Obiliq

Lipjan

Novo Brdo

Podujevë

Pristina

=== District of Prizren ===
Dragash

Malisheva

Mamusha

Prizren

Suva Reka

=== Historical ===
Former emblem of Pristina

Former emblem of Deçan

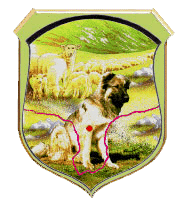
Former emblem of Dragash

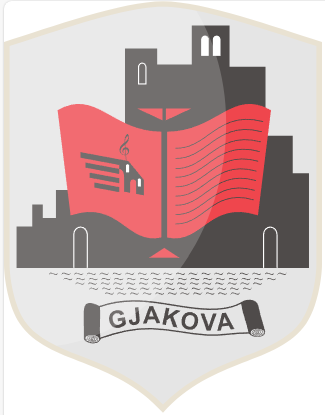
Former emblem of Gjakova

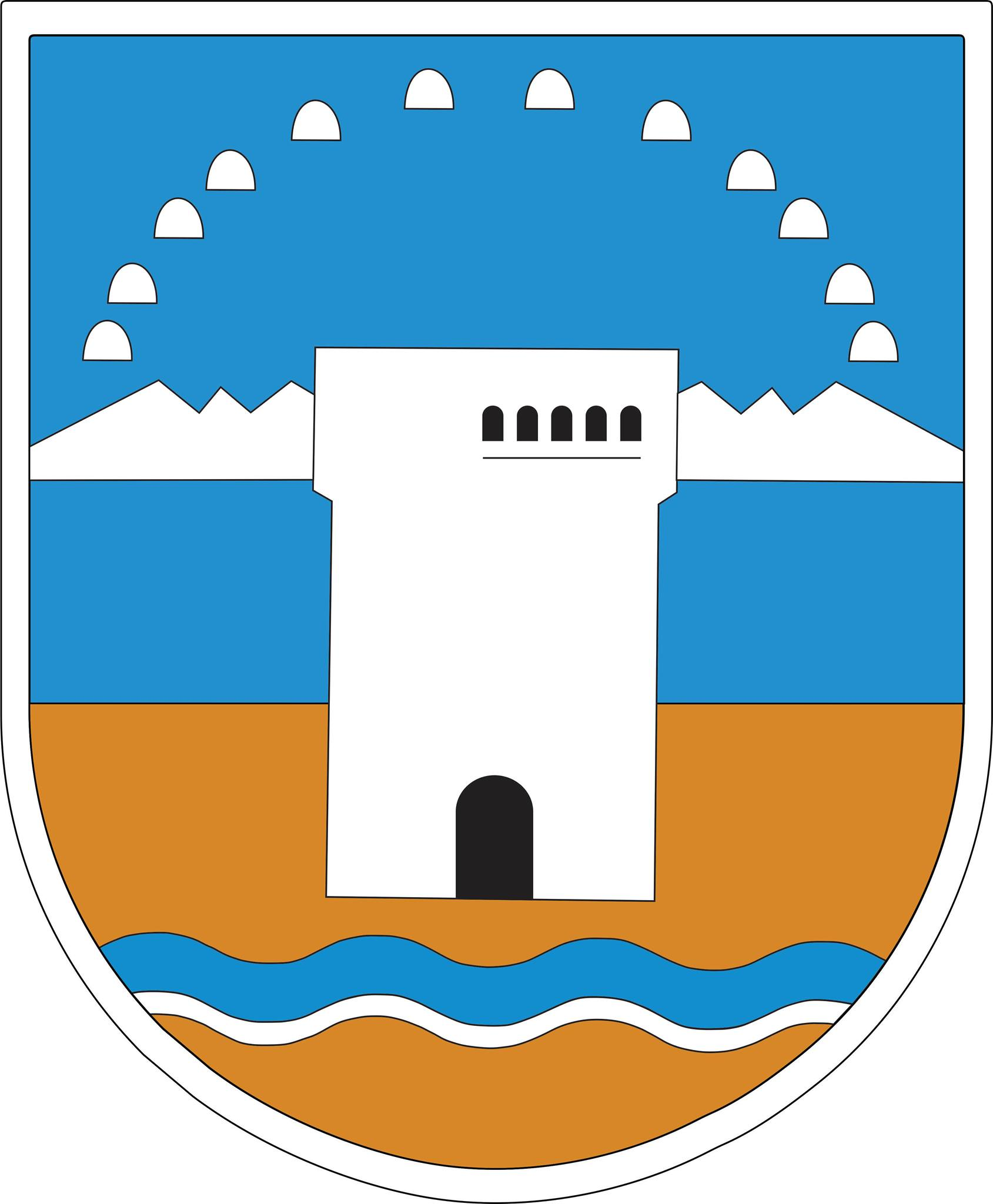
Former emblem of Junik

== See also ==
- Seal of Kosovo
- Flag of Kosovo (list)
- National symbols of Kosovo
