= Shqipria më 1927, e illustruar =

Albanian guide book

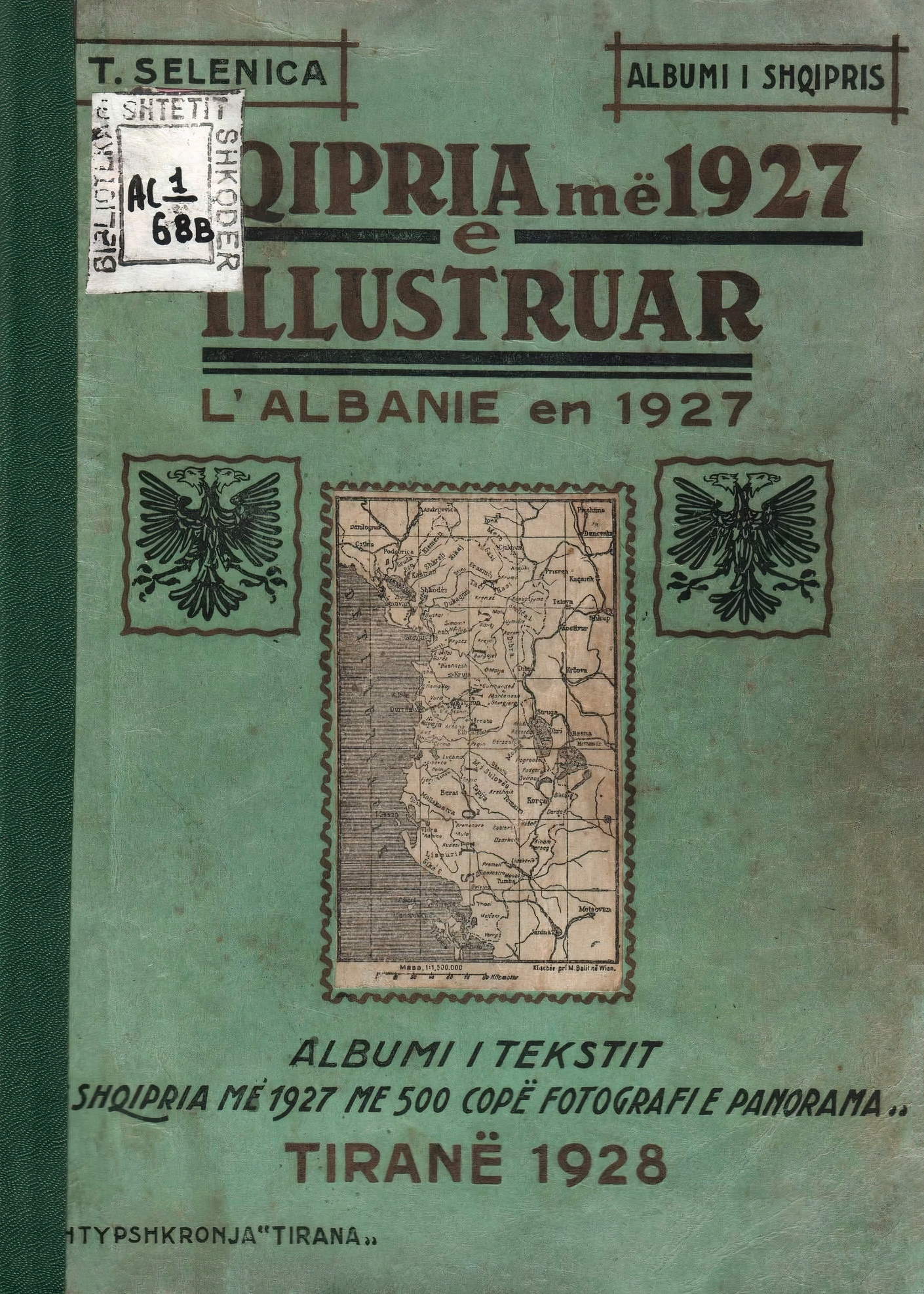
- Book cover
- Author: Teki Selenica
- Language: Albanian
- Genre: Guide book
- Published: 1928
- Publisher: Shtypshkronja "Tirana"
- Publication place: Albanian Republic
- Pages: 330

Shqipria më 1927, e illustruar is a 1928 Albanian encyclopedic guide book authored by Teki Selenica.

== Overview ==
Teki Selenica was an Albanian government official known for having initiated and organized the registration of the first population census in the country. He published an encyclopedic guide book in two volumes: "Albania in 1927" and "Illustrated Albania". The first volume consists of three parts: "Political, Social and Economic Albania" (185 pages); "Historical Albania" (161 pages); "Prefectures, sub-prefectures, communes, villages" (398 pages).

The second volume, rightly thought of as an illustrative and bilingual volume, published in 1928, adheres to the same structure of the first volume and has roughly 330 pages with a large collection of photographs of the then state buildings, of events and especially, of the people who made Albania a state. The book introduces us to the new developments of that period, highlighting the history of the people, the political actors of the time and provides accurate details about socio-economics and other aspects of daily life.
