= List of mass shootings in Italy =

This article is a list of mass shootings in Italy. Mass shootings are firearm-related violence with at least four casualties.

== 21st century ==
=== 2020s ===
Date	Location	Dead	Injured	Total	Description
29 April 2026	Foggia, Apulia	1	3 (Note: Including the perpetrator/s or suspect/s)	4	A man opened fire at a casalis in which members of a rival clan were staying, killing one and wounding two more. The perpetrator was also wounded in the shootout.
11 November 2025	Udine, Friuli-Venezia Giulia	0	4	4	A gunman fired over a dozen shots near the provincial police headquarters, wounding four men, before fleeing by vehicle.
16 August 2025	Forio, Campania	3	1	4	A man wounded his ex-wife and killed her partner and her mother before killing himself with a pistol outside a hotel.
16 July 2025	Taranto, Apulia	2	2	4	Two men were killed and two other people wounded in the Tamburi neighbourhood. The incident was drug-related.
26 April 2025	Monreale, Sicily	3	2	5	A brawl outside a club escalated into a shooting which left three men dead and two other people wounded.
25 September 2024	Nuoro, Sardinia	6	1	7	A man shot and killed his wife, two of his children, and a neighbor before killing himself. One of the man's children and the gunman's mother were wounded. The mother died in November from her injuries.
22 September 2024	Molfetta, Apulia	1	4	5	A gunman opened fire at a nightclub, killing a woman and wounding four other people.
19 July 2024	Padua, Veneto	0	4	4	A pensioner fired a rifle at young people celebrating a friend's graduation, wounding four. He jumped to his death from his balcony the following day as police investigated.
9 March 2024	Frosinone, Lazio	1	3	4	An Albanian man fired at a group of Albanians he had disputes with outside a bar, killing one person and wounding three others. He surrendered several hours later.
4 May 2023	Naples, Campania	1	3	4	Four people were shot, one fatally, while fans were celebrating S.S.C. Napoli's first Serie A title in thirty years. The one fatality was a known Camorra member.
30 March 2023	L'Aquila, Abruzzo	4	0	4	A man shot and killed three family members (his wife and their two children) with a pistol before killing himself.
11 December 2022	Rome, Lazio	4	3	7	A man opened fire at an apartment block meeting in the Fidenae neighborhood, killing four people and wounding three. The shooter was tackled by witnesses when his gun (a .45 Glock 41) jammed and was taken into custody.
28 August 2022	Prato, Tuscany	0	4	4	Two masked men entered a club, one of whom opened fire, wounding four men.
28 May 2022	Qualiano, Campania	0	4	4	A 37-year-old man shot and wounded four children from a passing motorbike. He was arrested the following day.
26 January 2022	Licata, Sicily	5	0	5	A man shot and killed four family members. He fled to a street in a different district, where he shot himself as carabinieri enclosed him. He died in hospital.
24 November 2021	Arzano, Campania	1	4	5	Five people were wounded in a shooting at a cafe. A 29-year-old victim later died of his injuries.
4 September 2021	Trieste, Friuli-Venezia Giulia	0	8	8	Eight people were wounded during a shootout between two groups.
21 July 2021	Taranto, Apulia	0	10	10	A man opened fire at a nightclub following an argument. Ten people were injured in the resulting gunfire.
13 June 2021	Ardea, Lazio	4	0	4	Ardea shooting: A man opened fire against passersby at a park, killing two children and an elderly man, before committing suicide.
10 April 2021	Rivarolo Canavese, Piedmont	4	1	5	A man shot and killed his wife and disabled son before luring two of his neighbours to the residence and killing them. He then shot himself, but survived.
8 November 2020	Carignano, Piedmont	3	1	4	A man shot three family members, killing two, before committing suicide.
17 October 2020	Reggio Emilia, Emilia-Romagna	0	5	5	After an argument, a man shot and wounded five people in a public square before fleeing. He was arrested several hours later at his house.
8 August 2020	Catania, Sicily	2	4	6	Members of two Mafia groups exchanged gunfire, leaving two people dead and four others wounded.

=== 2010s ===
Date	Location	Dead	Injured	Total	Description
11 October 2019	Foggia, Apulia	4	0	4	A prison official shot and killed his wife and two children with his service pistol before killing himself.
13 July 2019	Savona, Liguria	1	3	4	A man shot and killed his ex-partner and wounded three other people at a karaoke party before fleeing.
9 December 2018	Paternò, Sicily	4	0	4	A man shot and killed his wife and two children before committing suicide.
15 November 2018	Vairano Patenora, Campania	5	0	5	A man walked into his ex-wife's store and opened fire, killing her and her sister and wounding her parents before killing himself. Both parents later died of their injuries.
28 September 2018	Cursi, Apulia	3	1	4	A man fired at neighbours with a revolver, killing three people and wounding another before being arrested.
11 May 2018	Limbadi/Nicotera, Calabria	2	3	5	A man went on a shooting rampage, killing two people at their homes and wounding three people at a bar.
4 April 2018	Brescia, Lombardy	3	1	4	A man opened fire at a warehouse and a home, killing two people and wounding another, all of whom were affiliated with his previous criminal activities. He killed himself in Azzano Mella.
2 March 2018	Cisterna di Latina, Lazio	3	1	4	A carabiniere shot and wounded his wife, then killed his two daughters and himself with his service pistol.
12 February 2018	Cosenza, Calabria	4	0	4	A man shot and killed his wife, two children, and himself.
9 February 2018	Pisa, Tuscany	0	4	4	A 21-year-old man shot and wounded four people with a pistol following an argument. He was arrested the same day.
3 February 2018	Macerata, Marche	0	6	6	Macerata shooting: A far-right gunman opened fire on people of African descent, wounding six.
23 January 2018	Bellona, Campania	2	5	7	A man killed his wife before firing shots at pedestrians with a hunting rifle, wounding five people. He then killed himself.
18 November 2017	Sava, Apulia	3	1	4	A carabiniere killed his father, sister, and brother-in-law before attempting suicide by shooting himself in the chin, but surviving.
18 November 2017	Naples, Campania	0	4	4	Four people were wounded by gunfire after a dispute in Chiaia.
9 August 2017	San Marco in Lamis, Apulia	4	0	4	As part of the Gargano conflict, gunmen killed a Mafia clan leader and his brother-in-law, as well as two farmers who had witnessed the shooting.
21 April 2017	Naples, Campania	0	4	4	Four people were injured in a dispute between neighbours.
25 February 2017	Rome, Lazio	0	4	4	Four people were wounded by gunfire on Piazza Guglielmo Marconi in EUR.
4 January 2017	Naples, Campania	0	4	4	Four people, including a 10-year-old girl, were shot and wounded in the downtown.
2 November 2016	Genoa, Liguria	4	0	4	A police officer shot and killed his wife and two children in their apartment in the Cornigliano quarter before calling an emergency line and informing police of the shooting. He then killed himself.
22 April 2016	Naples, Campania	2	3	5	A group of men killed two people and wounded three others.
31 March 2016	Brancaleone, Calabria	0	4	4	Four people were shot and wounded in a Roma camp following an argument. A suspect was later arrested.
26 February 2016	Rovigo, Veneto	3	1	4	A man shot and killed his estranged wife and her mother and wounded his wife's new partner outside a dog shelter before killing himself.
12 July 2015	Trentola Ducenta, Campania	4	0	4	A man shot and killed four neighbours in a dispute.
19 May 2015	Afragola, Campania	0	8	8	A former security guard opened fire from his home on neighbours, wounding four adults, two teenagers, and two children. He fled, but was arrested.
15 May 2015	Naples, Campania	5	5	10	A man fired from the balcony of his home in the Secondigliano quarter, killing five people (including two relatives and a police officer) and wounding five others before being arrested.
9 April 2015	Milan, Lombardy	3	2	5	A man shot and killed three people and wounded two others at a courthouse before fleeing. He was later arrested.
25 March 2015	Ottaviano, Campania	1	8	9	Two off-duty carabinieri robbed a supermarket before fleeing by car. The supermarket's owners and several employees followed the robbers and rammed their car, after which a shootout occurred. One of the owners was killed and eight other people, including one of the robbers, were wounded by gunfire.
9 August 2014	San Fele, Basilicata	4	0	4	A man shot and killed his wife and two children before killing himself.
6 July 2014	Perugia, Umbria	2	2	4	A man fatally shot his ex-partner and wounded her son and her friend before fatally shooting himself.
31 December 2013	Collegno, Piedmont	4	0	4	A man opened fire on family members during a New Year's Eve celebration, killing his wife, mother-in-law, and daughter before killing himself.
25 August 2013	Lauro, Campania	4	2	6	A former security guard went into his neighbours' house and began shooting, fatally wounding a man, his pregnant daughter, and his mother-in-law, as well as wounding the man's partner and his son. The pregnant woman gave birth while in a coma, but the baby died a year later.
20 July 2013	Reggio Calabria, Calabria	1	3	4	A man fired two guns at his family members during a dispute about a parking space, killing his sister-in-law and wounding his brother and two nephews. He was arrested at the scene.
28 April 2013	Rome, Lazio	0	4	4	A man opened fire in front of Chigi Palace, wounding two Carabinieri before being injured by return fire and arrested. A bystander was hit by a stray bullet.
4 March 2012	Brescia, Lombardy	4	0	4	A man shot and killed his ex-wife, a friend of hers, her daughter, and the daughter's boyfriend. He was disarmed and arrested at the scene as he attempted to shoot himself.
12 February 2012	Turin, Piedmont	0	4	4	A man began shooting outside a nightclub, wounding four individuals.
13 December 2011	Florence, Tuscany	3	3	6	2011 Florence shootings: A far-right sympathizer shot and killed two Senegalese market traders and wounded another before fleeing by vehicle. He traveled to another market and wounded two other traders, then killed himself as police approached him in a car park.
11 January 2011	Quartu Sant'Elena, Sardinia	3	1	4	A man shot and wounded his ex-wife and killed her new boyfriend and her mother. The shooter, an ex-carabiniere, later killed himself.
9 January 2011	Genoa, Liguria	4	0	4	A man shot and killed two neighbours in the street, then entered his apartment and killed his wife. After a thirty-minute standoff, the shooter fatally shot himself.
26 December 2010	Vibo Valentia, Calabria	5	0	5	A man and his four sons were shot to death at their home in a land dispute.
15 August 2010	Maddaloni, Campania	0	5	5	A man got into an argument at a bar with two people and opened fire, wounding them and three bystanders.
17 January 2010	Turin, Piedmont	0	4	4	As a group of Romanian men exited a club, a group of Albanians crashed into their car and began attacking them, first with bats and then with guns. Three Romanians and an Italian bystander were shot and wounded.

=== 2000s ===
Date	Location	Dead	Injured	Total	Description
24 May 2009	Milan, Lombardy	1	3	4	A Mafia member was killed and three bystanders wounded at a bar in Quarto Oggiaro.
21 November 2008	Verona, Veneto	5	0	5	A man shot and killed his wife and three children before committing suicide.
1 November 2008	Secondigliano, Campania	0	5	5	Five children were wounded outside an arcade by several gunmen.
18 September 2008	Castel Volturno, Campania	7	1	8	Castel Volturno massacre: Camorra gunmen killed an arcade manager and six migrants and wounded another immigrant.
30 March 2008	Cittanova, Calabria	1	3	4	Two groups fired at each other, leaving one man dead and three others wounded.
3 November 2007	Guidonia, Lazio	2	17	19	A man shot from his window, killing two people and wounding seventeen before being arrested.
17 October 2007	Reggio Emilia, Emilia-Romagna	3	2	5	A man shot and killed his wife and brother-in-law during a divorce hearing at a courthouse, then fired on people nearby, wounding two, before police officers shot him dead.
1 August 2007	Reggio Calabria, Calabria	1	3	4	A security guard shot and wounded three bandits attempting to rob the armored van he was driving; the bandits returned fire, killing him. The three criminals injured, as well as an accomplice, were arrested.
27 March 2006	Caraffa di Catanzaro, Calabria	4	0	4	A man shot and killed his uncle, aunt, and two cousins. He killed himself in prison.
28 June 2005	Bogogno, Piedmont	3	9	12	A man killed a bailiff serving an eviction notice at the gunman's home before shooting at passersby. He killed another two people and wounded nine others before being arrested.
25 May 2005	Verona, Veneto	4	0	4	Verona massacre: A serial killer fatally shot a prostitute before killing two police officers as they responded to the scene. He was killed by return fire.
22 April 2005	Santa Teresa Gallura, Sardinia	2	2	4	Two shooters killed a land owner and foreman and injured two workers at an estate.
7 December 2004	Fagnano Castello, Calabria	0	4	4	A man shot and wounded his wife, her brother, and their aunt before attempting suicide.
6 November 2004	Naples, Campania	1	5	6	During a fight between Camorra factions, a shooting occurred in which one person was killed and five others wounded. None of the people shot had a criminal record.
18 May 2004	Naples, Campania	1	3	4	One man was killed and three others wounded in Chiaiano.
11 January 2004	Viganò, Lombardy	4	0	4	A man shot his wife and two sons to death with a pistol before killing himself.
22 August 2003	Rozzano, Lombardy	4	0	4	A man opened fire in a public square on two friends who he had a drug dispute with, killing them and two bystanders, including a 2-year-old girl.
8 July 2003	Genoa, Liguria	4	0	4	A police officer killed his wife and two children with his service weapon in the Cornigliano quarter before shooting himself dead.
29 June 2003	Rome, Lazio	4	0	4	A man shot and killed his partner's two children and her mother before fatally shooting himself.
5 May 2003	Milan, Lombardy	3	3	6	A man killed his wife before shooting four pedestrians, killing one, and committing suicide.
2 May 2003	Aci Castello, Sicily	6	0	6	An upset municipal council worker shot and killed the mayor of Aci Castello and two other workers in the city hall. He also killed a random person in the city hall and a man on a park bench outside during the attack. After carjacking a man and driving to Vittoria, the shooter killed himself in a church.
21 November 2002	Riccò del Golfo di Spezia, Liguria	2	4	6	A man killed his wife and his caregiver's husband and wounded the caregiver and two responding police officers before attempting suicide and being arrested.
15 October 2002	Chieri, Piedmont	8	0	8	A man shot and killed seven people between two neighbouring apartments before committing suicide.
14 October 2002	Reggio Emilia, Emilia-Romagna	4	0	4	A man killed his wife and daughter and wounded the daughter's boyfriend before shooting himself. The two wounded men later died of their wounds.
20 October 2000	Albenga, Liguria	2	2	4	A man shot and killed two of his children and wounded his wife and daughter with a shotgun before being arrested.
14 August 2000	Genoa, Liguria	5	0	5	A man shot and killed four people in the Bolzaneto quarter, including two family members, before killing himself.
21 June 2000	Palma di Montechiaro, Sicily	5	1	6	A man shot and killed four family members with a pistol and wounded another before killing himself.
10 June 2000	Verderio Superiore, Lombardy	4	0	4	A police officer shot and killed his wife and two children before killing himself. Their bodies were discovered by the shooter's brother-in-law two days later.
21 March 2000	Pozzuoli, Campania	1	3	4	Four young men rammed an off-duty soldier's car against the barrier of a highway, then exited their car to rob the soldier. The soldier shot the four, killing one of them.

== 20th century ==
=== 1990s ===
Date	Location	Dead	Injured	Total	Description
5 March 1999	Padua, Veneto	3	1	4	A technician at the University of Padua opened fire on his bosses during a case meeting, killing one and wounding three (one person was grazed). Two of the wounded victims died of their injuries five and six years after the shooting.
2 January 1999	Vittoria, Sicily	5	0	5	Two gunmen began shooting people inside a bar, killing five. Three of the victims had Mafia connections, while the other two were unaffiliated.
14 May 1998	Lomellina, Lombardy	5	1	6	A woman shot and killed four family members and wounded another before killing herself.
8 May 1998	Oppido Mamertina, Reggio Calabria	4	3	7	Oppido Mamertina shooting: A shooting incident left four people dead and three others wounded.
16 April 1997	Barcellona Pozzo di Gotto, Sicily	5	0	5	A man shot and killed four family members before killing himself.
5 March 1997	Lucca, Tuscany	2	2	4	A man fired shots from a hunting rifle at his wife and neighbours, killing his wife and wounding two other people before killing himself.
19 November 1996	Buonvicino, Calabria	6	0	6	Buonvicino massacre: A police officer shot and killed six members of his ex-wife's family with a pistol. He was arrested at another location.
16 August 1995	Chilivani, Sardinia	3	2	1	Chilivani massacre: Two police officers and one bandit were shot dead in a shootout in Sardinia.
15 March 1995	Macerata Campania/Santa Maria Capua Vetere, Campania	7 (Note: Five by gunfire)	2	9	A man shot and killed three family members at their home; one was shot and died of a heart attack. The shooter then went to his workplace and shot four people, killing two; another person died of a heart attack. The shooter surrendered to police at another location.
2 August 1993	Lentate sul Seveso, Lombardy	1	3	4	Two bank robbers exchanged gunfire with police as they fled the scene; two passersby were wounded by stray bullets. Officers killed one of the assailants and injured another.
7 February 1993	Sini, Sardinia	5	0	5	A man shot and killed five people at various locations.
3 January 1993	Santa Teresa Gallura, Sardinia	4	1	5	A man killed his two daughters and wounded two other people, one of whom later died, before committing suicide.
10 February 1991	Como, Lombardy	4	1	5	A man shot and killed three neighbours and wounded another with a pistol before committing suicide.
16 August 1990	Brescia, Lombardy	4	0	4	Two thieves killed four family members in a home.

=== 1980s ===
Date	Location	Dead	Injured	Total	Description
25 June 1989	Oria, Apulia	1	10	11	1989 Oria standoff: Roberto Di Giovanni, a 26-year-old man being treated for mental problems fired from the window of his house, killing one person and wounding ten others before being arrested.
23 November 1988	Campi Salentina, Apulia	6	0	6	A man shot and killed his ex-lover and four of her family members before killing himself.
16 November 1988	near Ravenna, Emilia-Romagna	5	0	5	A Carabinieri officer shot and killed four fellow officers in their barracks before committing suicide.
11 June 1988	Turin, Piedmont	3	1	4	After an argument with two other men, two gunmen walked into a pub and shot and killed the men and a teenage girl they were with. A second teenage girl was critically wounded.
1 April 1988	Torre del Greco, Campania	3	2	5	Gunmen killed three people and wounded two others in a restaurant.
27 December 1985	Rome, Fiumicino	19	99	118	1985 Rome and Vienna airport attacks: 4 militants of the Abu Nidal Organization entered the Leonardo da Vinci-Fiumicino Airport with assault rifles and hand grenades, killing 16 and injuring 99 people. 3 of the 4 shooters were killed by airports security guards. The attack occurred in accordance with another shooting at the Vienna International Airport.
26 July 1984	Corigliano Calabro, Calabria	0	10	10	A man shot and wounded ten people (including two police officers) with a rifle before being disarmed and arrested.
12 June 1983	Catania, Sicily	1	29	30	A guard at Stadio Cibali fired a shotgun at hooligans, killing one person. 29 others sustained gunshot wounds or cuts. The guard was charged with murder.
9 October 1982	Rome, Lazio	1	37	38	Great Synagogue of Rome attack: Five members of the Abu Nidal Organization opened fire at the Great Synagogue of Rome, also detonating hand grenades. One person was killed and 37 others wounded before the assailants fled.
15 July 1982	Naples, Campania	2	4	6	Members of the Red Brigades shot and killed a police official and his bodyguard before exchanging gunfire with police. Three civilians and at least one assailant were wounded.
27 April 1982	Catania, Sicily	5	8	13	Mafiosi threw hand grenades and fired submachine guns into a gambling den, killing five people and wounding eight others.
21 January 1982	Monteroni d'Arbia, Tuscany	3	1	4	Members of Prima Linea who had just robbed a bank opened fire on carabinieri, killing two and wounding one. One of the robbers was also killed, while the six other shooters were later arrested.
24 September 1981	Palmi, Calabria	1	6	7	A man killed a neighbor and wounded six other people, including a police officer, as he fired from his home.
3 November 1980	Messina, Sicily	1	5	6	A mental patient escaped a psychiatric hospital and barricaded himself in his house, from where he shot at pedestrians, killing one person and wounding five others.

=== 1970s ===
Date	Location	Dead	Injured	Total	Description
11 December 1979	Turin, Piedmont	0	10	10	Members of Prima Linea intruded into a business administration school and briefly took students hostage before singling out five students and five teachers and kneecapping them.
8 October 1979	Milan, Lombardy	3	1	4	A convicted murderer shot and killed three police officers, also sustaining gunshot wounds.
16 March 1978	Rome, Lazio	5	0	5	Kidnapping and murder of Aldo Moro: Five police officers were killed as former Prime Minister of Italy Aldo Moro was kidnapped by members of the Red Brigades.
10 July 1977	Rome, Lazio	4	2	6	A man shot and killed his wife and three children and wounded another child before attempting suicide.
14 November 1975	Vercelli, Piedmont	5	0	5	A woman and her boyfriend shot and killed five of the woman's family members.
11 May 1975	Ferentino, Lazio	4	8	12	A man shot twelve family members, killing four, before fleeing and later surrendering.
6 January 1974	Guardavalle, Calabria	5	8	13	Five people were killed and eight others wounded during gunbattles between rival families.
1 May 1971	Turin, Piedmont	4	0	4	A man armed with a pistol shot and killed four men at a bar.
23 February 1971	Genoa, Liguria	2	6	8	A man shot eight relatives at a hospital, killing two before fleeing. He was arrested in Recco.

=== 1960s ===
Date	Location	Dead	Injured	Total	Description
30 January 1967	Mirano, Veneto	1	4	5	A gunman injured four carabiniere before police shot and killed him.
16 January 1967	Vetrego, Veneto	1	3	4	A man shot and killed his wife and wounded two neighbours. His son exchanged gunfire with him, wounding the gunman.
8 August 1966	Grosseto, Tuscany	4	0	5	A man shot and killed his wife, daughter, and his daughter's fiancé before killing himself.
22 January 1965	Sanremo, Liguria	2	4	6	A retired soldier shot and killed one man and wounded four others at a courthouse before being fatally shot by police.
31 October 1960	Salerno, Campania	0	23	23	A peasant carrying a shotgun opened fire in a church, wounding 23 people.
28 February 1960	Forcella, Lazio	1	6	7	A man shot seven family members, killing one, before fleeing. He was captured the following day.

=== 1950s ===
Date	Location	Dead	Injured	Total	Description
26 September 1959	Catanzaro, Calabria	2	4	6	A man shot and killed two people before fleeing. He later returned and shot into a crowd, wounding four people.
4 June 1959	Roccadaspide, Campania	5	0	5	A man shot and killed four members of a family before killing himself.
20 October 1957	Moncalieri, Piedmont	3	1	4	A man fatally shot two women and wounded another before killing himself.
7 July 1957	Castello Tesino, Trentino-Alto Adige/Südtirol	5	5	10	A man wounded four people with a pistol at a hotel before going on a shooting spree, killing four others. The gunman committed suicide as police surrounded him in a nearby forest.
8 May 1957	Garlasco, Lombardy	2	2	4	A man killed a policeman and wounded his daughter and another policeman before killing himself.
10 October 1956	Terrazzano, Lombardy	1	3	4	Two brothers went into a school carrying guns, dynamite and acid. They took 96 children and three teachers hostage for about six hours. They demanded 200 million lire for the release of their hostages or they would kill them. Using the children as shields, they exchanged gunfire with police outside the school, during which one person was killed and three others injured. The hostage crisis ended when a teacher restrained the perpetrators.
3 July 1956	Busto Arsizio, Lombardy	5	6	11	A man fired from his job as a baker's boy killed his former employer and the employer's wife and son with a Sten submachine gun. He exchanged gunfire with police, killing one person and wounding six others before killing himself.
3 February 1956	Genoa, Liguria	0	5	5	A patient shot and wounded five people with two pistols at a hospital before being disarmed and arrested.
14 June 1954	Arena, Calabria	2	3	5	A man shot and killed his sister and wounded three pedestrians before killing himself.
23 April 1954	Carrara, Tuscany	0	9	9	A man shot and wounded his mother and eight neighbours with a rifle before being disarmed and arrested.
2 December 1953	Sanremo, Liguria	3	6	9	A man roamed through the streets firing a shotgun and pistol, killing one person and wounding seven others before committing suicide. A wounded victim died the following day.
12 October 1953	Bologna, Emilia-Romagna	2	2	4	A man shot and killed two co-workers and wounded another. He was also shot before he was apprehended.
7 September 1953	Catania, Sicily	3	3	6	A man shot six family members, killing three, before fleeing. After being on the run for more than a month, he was shot by police and killed himself.
7 May 1953	Villa Literno, Campania	4	2	6	A man opened fire in various districts, killing four people and wounding two others, including his brother. The shooter was apprehended four days later.
6 May 1953	Latina, Lazio	4	0	4	A jealous man shot three people dead with a revolver inside a church, including his romantic interest and her fiancé. He then killed himself.
8 April 1953	Foggia, Apulia	5	0	5	A 42-year-old farmer killed his wife and three children, before killing himself.
6 March 1953	Pavullo nel Frignano, Emilia-Romagna	2	7	9	A man shot at police and others that approached his house, killing a police officer and wounding seven other people, including one carabinieriere, four soldiers, and two civilians. The man was killed by police fire.
9 July 1952	Massa Marittima, Tuscany	6	0	6	A man killed five relatives of a woman who rejected his advances before committing suicide.
23 January 1951	Rome, Lazio	0	15	15	A mentally ill man opened fire from his window, wounding fifteen people before being detained.
16 August 1950	Rome, Lazio	1	3	4	A man shot his mistress, a boy, and two neighbours, killing the boy.
22 February 1950	Filottrano, Marche	3	23	26	A man fired at random neighbours, killing two people and wounding 23 others before committing suicide.

=== 1930s ===
Date	Location	Dead	Injured	Total	Description
June 1939	Ruta, Liguria	5	0	5	A man shot and killed his two children, wife and a nanny, before killing himself.
6 October 1933	Gorzegno, Piedmont	3	3	6	After an argument with his brother a 68 year old man opened fire in his village with a double-barrel shotgun, killing the local priest and his nephew, he then would barricate himself in a farm injuring 2 carabinieri and a journalist. After a long standoff he would be killed by the police.

=== 1920s ===
Date	Location	Dead	Injured	Total	Description
25 June 1925	Librizzi, Sicily	10	4	14	After an argument, a mentally ill man opened fire on townspeople, killing nine and wounding four. The gunman was shot dead by a nephew.
January 1924	Brolo, Sicily	4	0	4	A man killed three people as he shot into a crowd at a wedding before killing himself.
20 July 1922	Pietrafitta, Calabria	7	1	8	A man killed seven family members and wounded another before being arrested.

=== 1910s ===
Date	Location	Dead	Injured	Total	Description
13 July 1914	Camerata Cornello, Lombardy	7	0	7	An anarchist used a rifle to kill seven people in a village before escaping. He was never found.
19 October 1913	Rovato, Lombardy	6	0	6	An escaped murderer set fire to his home before killing three family members and three others and escaping to the woods.
4 September 1912	Genoa, Liguria	5	6	11	Three men shot and killed a tram conductor pursuing them for not paying fares, then fired at police officers who responded to the scene. Two officers and a carabiniere were killed and five others wounded, including three bystanders. One perpetrator was killed and another wounded in the shootout, while the third fled and was later captured.
27 July 1912	Bajano	5	1	6	A man shot five people with a revolver, killing four (including three family members and a police officer) before being shot dead by police.
11 October 1910	Rome, Lazio	1	3	4	A man shot at people from his home, killing one person and wounding three others before police set fires and drove him out.

=== 1900s ===
Date	Location	Dead	Injured	Total	Description
14 September 1900	Pastena, Lazio	11	1	12	Gaetano Longo, concerned his wife was having an affair, killed her and nine others before committing suicide.

== 19th century ==
=== 1890s ===
Date	Location	Dead	Injured	Total	Description
May 1893	Nicastro, Calabria	6–7	0	6–7	A man killed several family members and himself.

=== 1870s ===
Date	Location	Dead	Injured	Total	Description
June 1870	Castel Baronia, Campania	7	0	7	A man killed six family members and himself.
