= Demetrio Capuzzimati =

Albanian mercenary captain active in Apulia, Kingdom of Naples

Demetrio Capuzzimati (Albanian: Dhimiter Këpucmadhi) (c. 1480 – February 15, 1557, San Marzano di San Giuseppe) was an Albanian Stradiot captain in Apulia, then part of the Kingdom of Naples, and was the son of a soldier who had fought with Scanderbeg. He was also the first Baron of San Marzano.

== Name and career ==
Capuzzimati or Capuzzimadi is an Italianized version of the Albanian ” këpucmadhe”, meaning ” big shoe”. Capuzzimati fought against a conspiracy of the local barons during the years of 1459–1462. He also fought in the Italian wars against Francis I of France. On July 27, 1530, the royalty of San Marzano, together with the title of Baron, was sold by the viceroy of Naples, Cardinal Pompeo Colonna, to Capuzzimati for 700 ducats, which he used as a place for immigrating Albanian families to immigrate. The same year, he was appointed by Charles V. He died in 1557 and his oldest son Cesare inherited his wealth. He died in 1595. His successor was his son Demetrius Junior in 1595. The same year, the Royal Chamber expropriated the wealth of Demetrius and sold it at an auction in 1639 for 20,000 ducats to the Duke of Taurisano, Francesco Lopez of Royo, of Spanish origin

The descendants of Capuzzimati today still live in San Marzano di San Giuseppe, and some descendants in southern Germany in Leutkirch im Allgäu in the line from Cosimo Reo from Leutkirch produce wine, olive oil, and Grappa and manage Restaurants, Hotels, finance offices, and real estate.
