= San Marzano di San Giuseppe =

San Marzano di San Giuseppe Shën Marcani
- Comune
- Comune di San Marzano di San Giuseppe
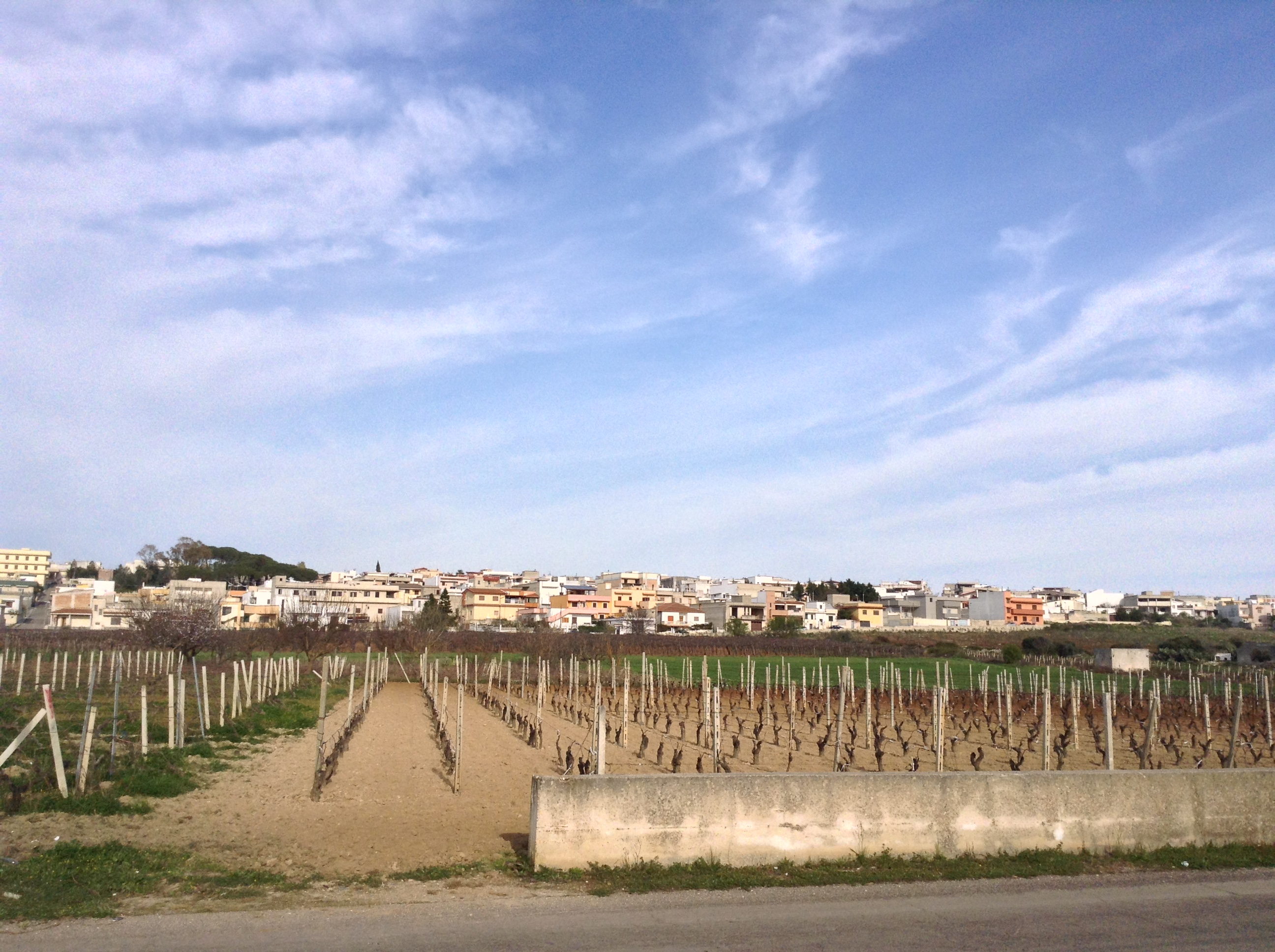
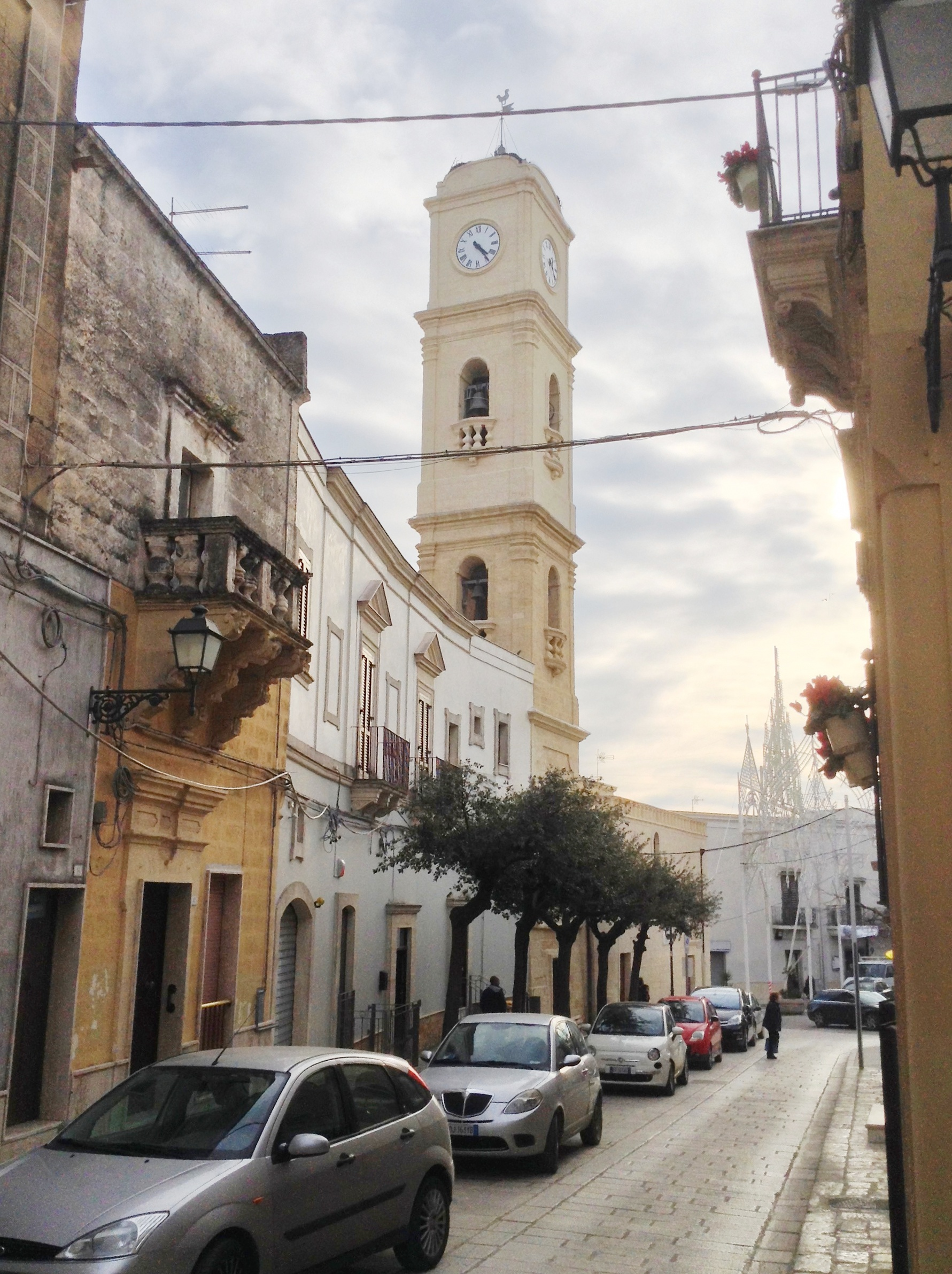
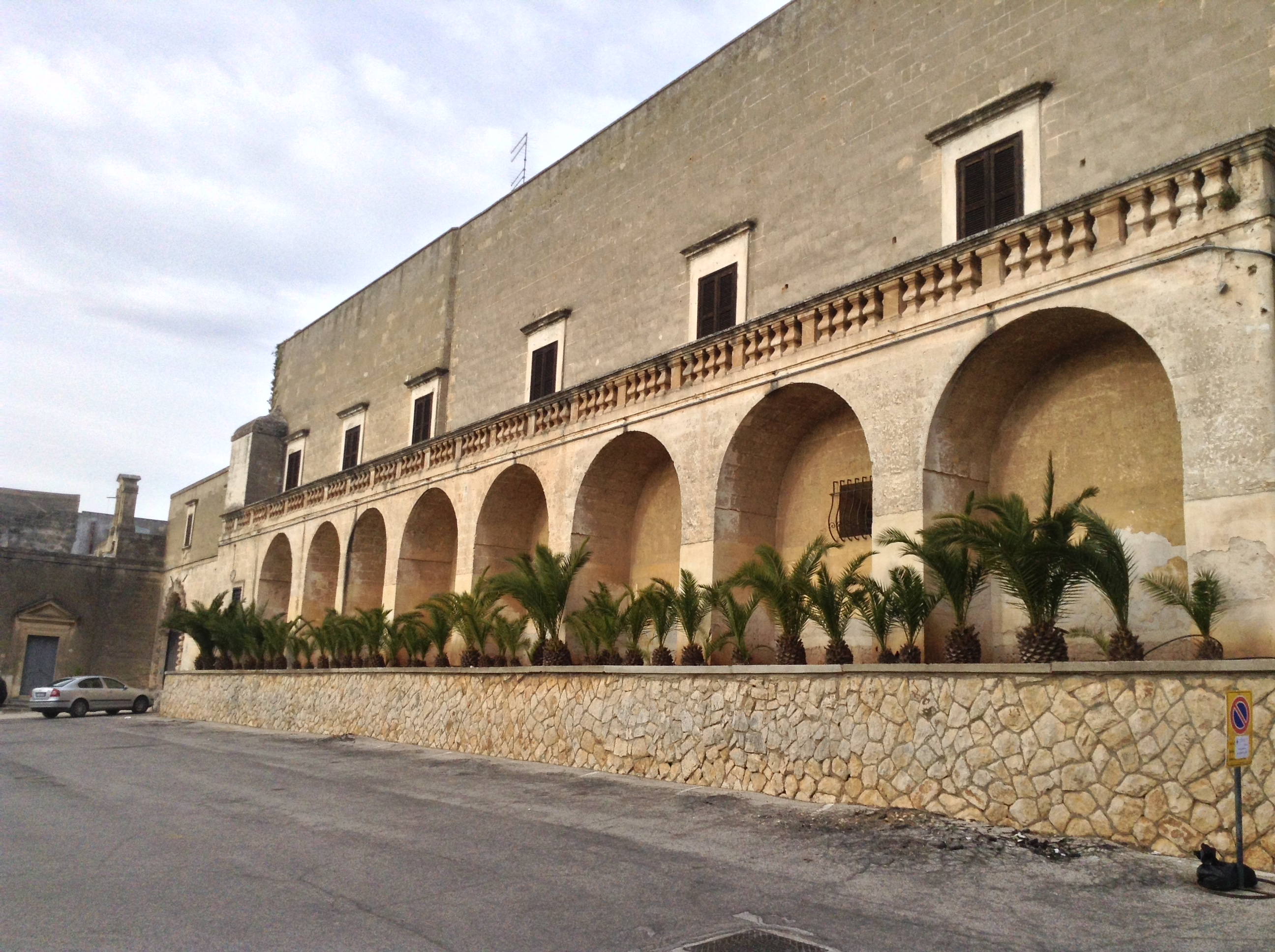
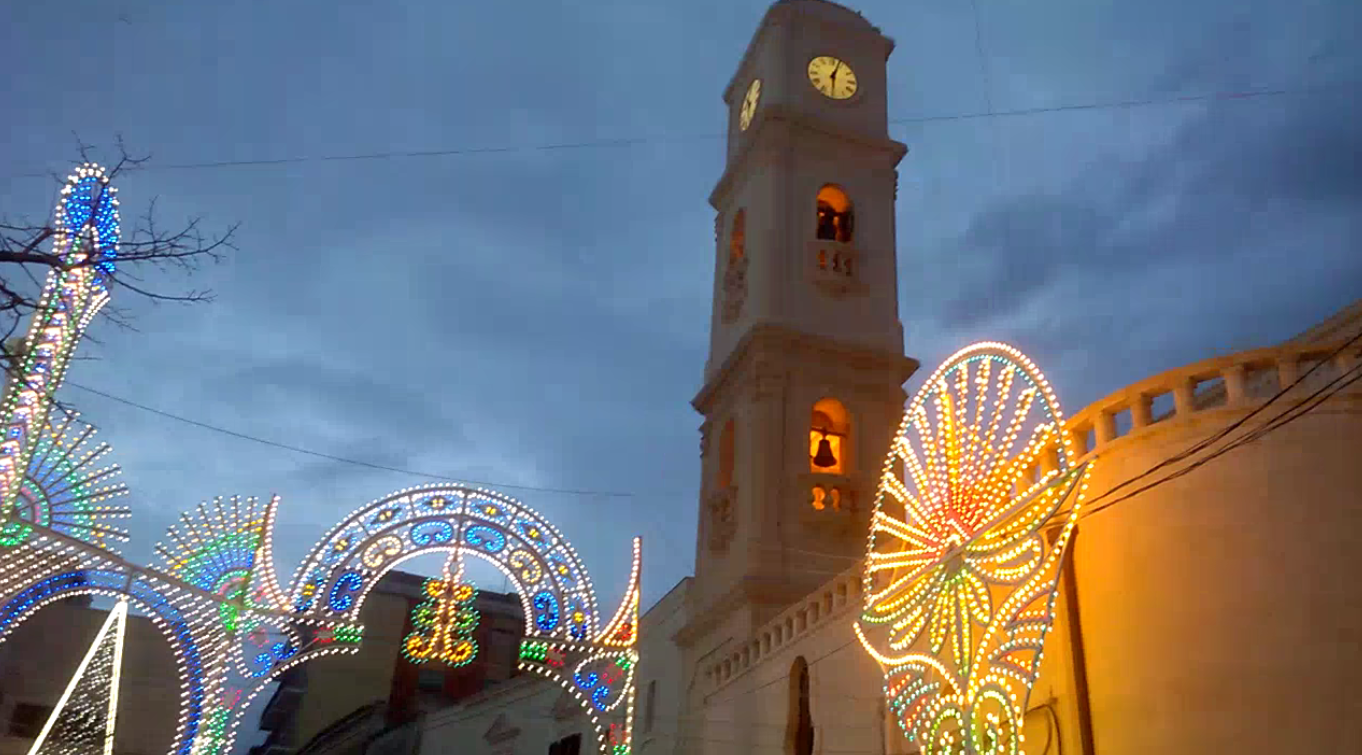
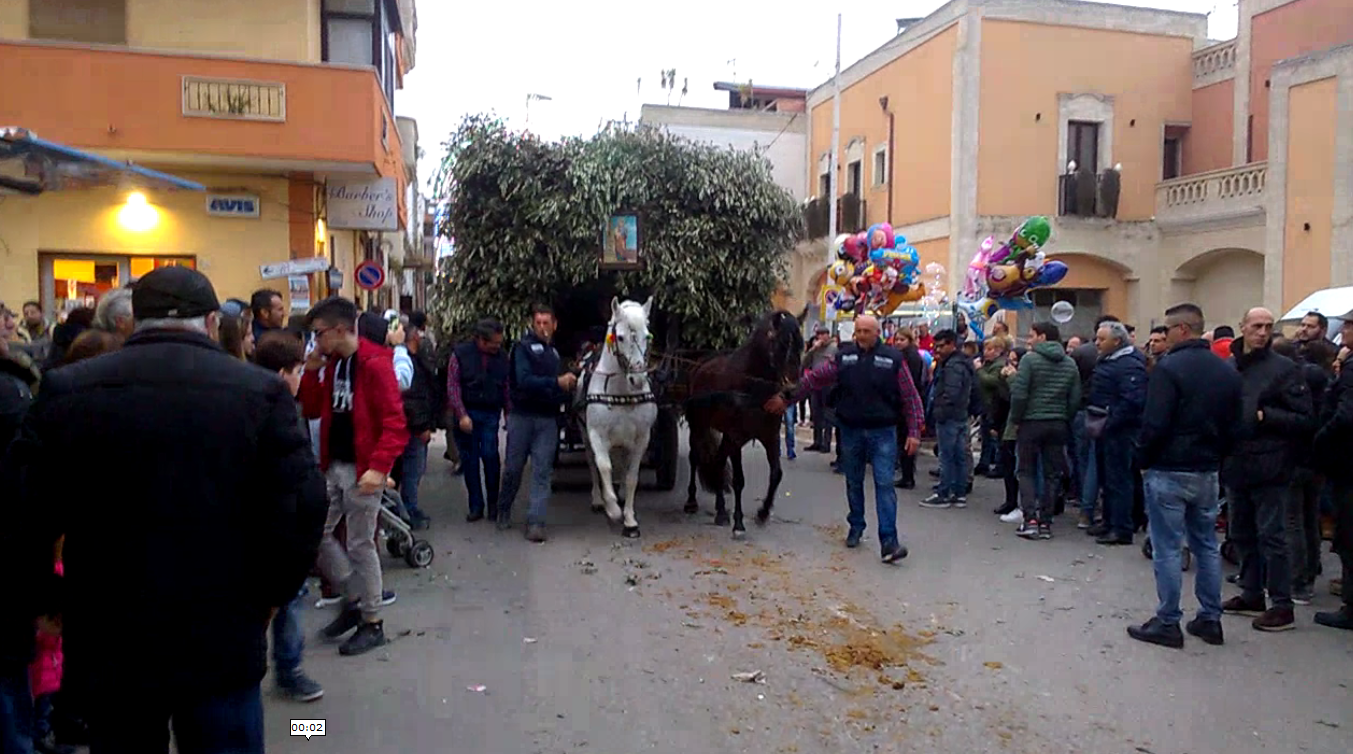
- San Marzano Church of San Carlo Borromeo Palazzo Capuzzimati Luminaria during the patronal celebration of Saint Joseph Procession of the fascine during the patronal celebration of St Joseph

- Location within Italy Location within Apulia
- Coordinates: 40°27′N 17°30′E
- Country: Italy
- Region: Apulia
- Province: Taranto (TA)

Government
  - Mayor: Francesco Leo

Area
  - Total: 19 km^{2} (7.3 sq mi)
- Elevation: 134 m (440 ft)

Population (31 January 2024)
  - Total: 8,862
  - Density: 470/km^{2} (1,200/sq mi)
- Demonym: Sanmarzanesi
- Time zone: UTC+1 (CET)
  - Summer (DST): UTC+2 (CEST)
- Postal code: 74020
- Dialing code: 099
- Patron saint: Saint Joseph
- Saint day: March 19
- Website: Official website

San Marzano di San Giuseppe (Arbëreshë Albanian: Shën Marcani) is a town and comune in the Province of Taranto, in the Italian region of Apulia. Alongside Casalvecchio di Puglia and Chieuti, it is one of the Arbëreshë communities still existing in Apulia.

The economy is largely based on the cultivation of olive trees and wine.

== History ==
=== From the Neolithic to the Ancient Times ===
The territory around San Marzano was already inhabited in the Neolithic (5th millennium BC), as confirmed by numerous finds. Near the Sanctuary of the Madonna delle Grazie, there are caves excavated as tombs, dating back to the late Bronze Age (1300-800 BC) and then reused in the early Middle Ages (500–1050) as underground dwellings. In the Contrada Neviera (the area near the sanctuary) the remains of a massive wall were discovered which may have been the border line between the Greek area (Chora Tarantina) and the indigenous (Messapian) area of Oria. In the Roman period (8th century BC-7th century AD), the territory of San Marzano was located on the border with Oria Messapica and was under the jurisdiction of the territory of Taranto. In the area of the Masseria Casa Rossa there was a "Pagus" (village). Furthermore, numerous archaeological finds existed in Contrada Pezza Padula, such as coins and the remains of a countryside villa, perhaps belonging to a patrician. Occasional findings of tombs from the early medieval period with funerary furnishings as well as some Byzantine coins are preserved in the National Archaeological Museum of Taranto.

=== San Marzano in the Middle Ages ===
It is known that the San Marzano di San Giuseppe area was inhabited during the Middle Ages. Due to the continuous incursions of the Saracens, which lasted from the 8th century until around the year 1000, the inhabitants retreated to the nearby scattered caves and communities in the hinterland, where they could live more peacefully. In the centuries before the arrival of the Albanians, there is almost no information on the feudal succession of San Marzano. In 1465, the fiefdom, together with the Principality of Taranto, was incorporated into the Kingdom of Naples by Joanna of Aragon, widow of Ferdinand I and heir to the Principality and partially assigned in small fiefdoms to families of proven Aragonese faith.

=== Demetrio Capuzzimati and the Albanian Settlement ===
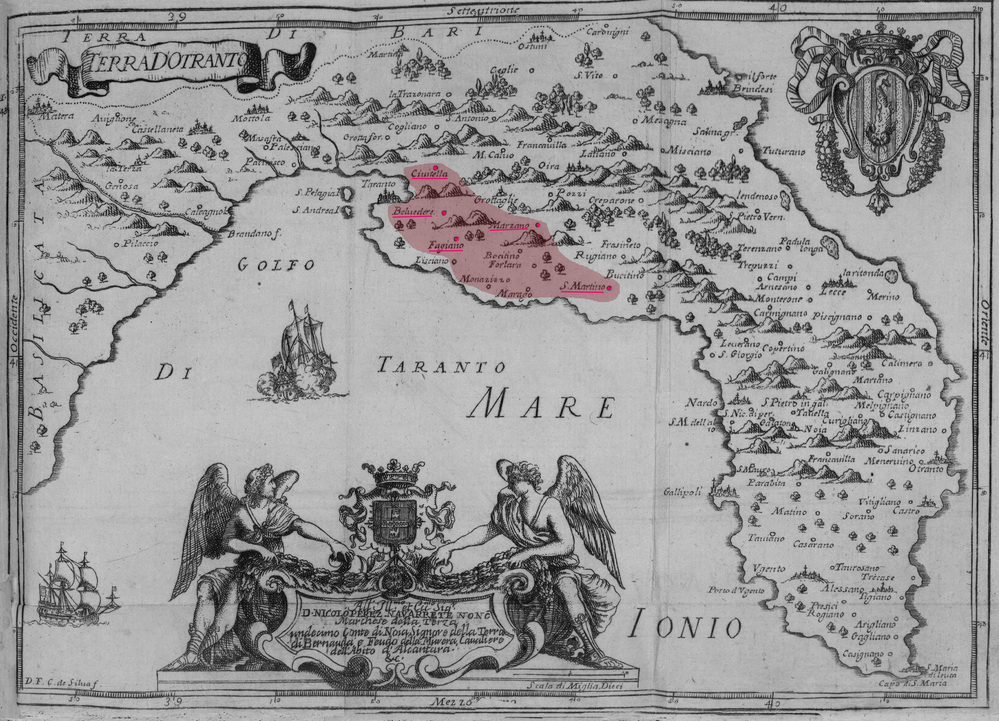
Approximate location of Albania Tarantina

Towards the end of the 15th century and the beginning of the 16th century, many hamlets in Taranto Albania, destroyed by the soldiers of Giorgio Castriota Scanderbeg during the revolt of the local barons (1459–1462), were rebuilt and settled by the soldiers themselves. At the beginning of the 16th century, the fiefdom of San Marzano belonged to Stefano di Mayra di Nardò, Lord of the hamlet of Sava. In 1504, Mayra sold the uninhabited fiefdom to Francesco Antoglietta, 8th baron of Fragagnano. By 1508, some Corfiot and Epirote families from the nearby village of Fragagnano had settled in the lower part of San Marzano.

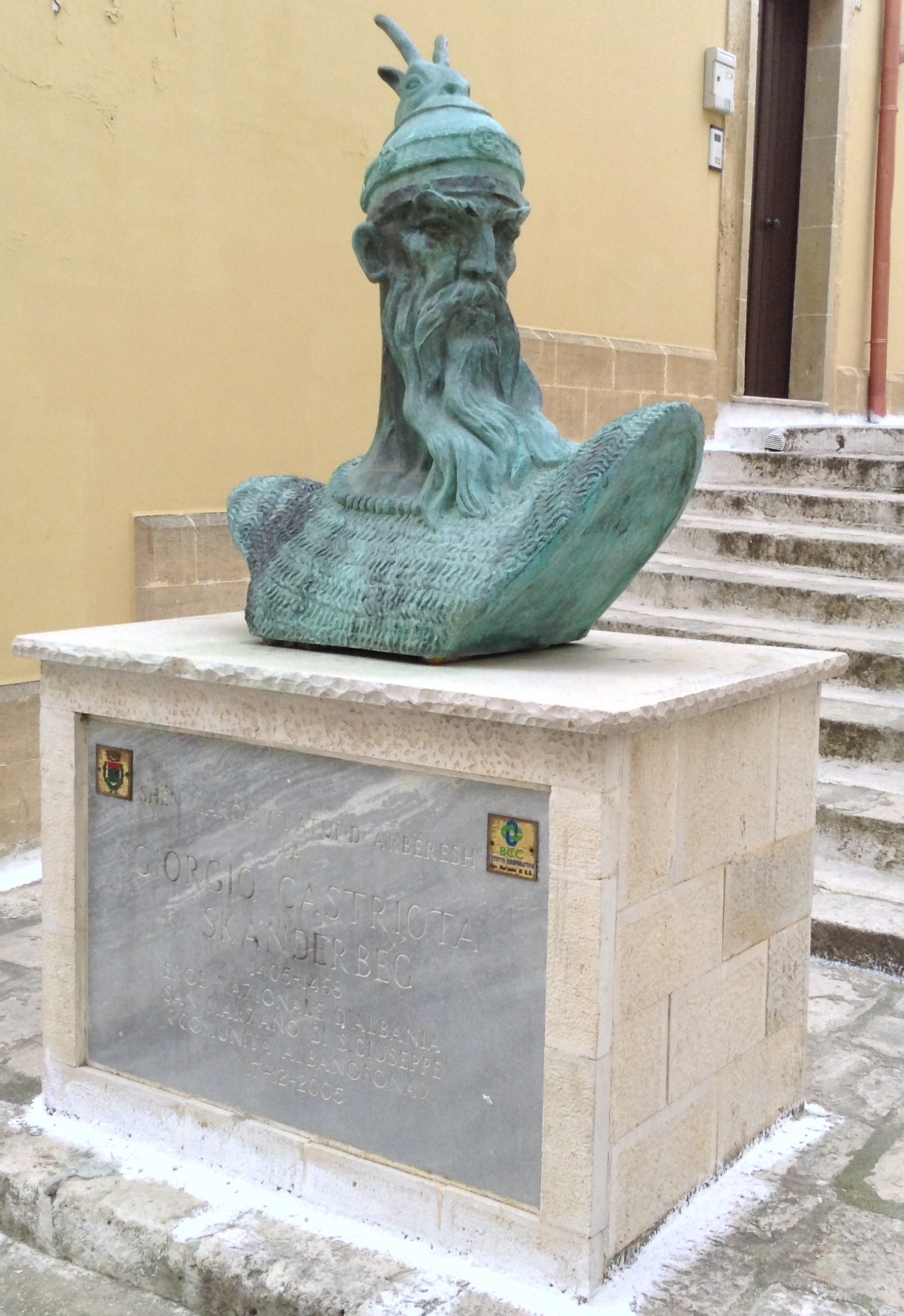
Bust of the Albanian Military Leader, Giorgio Castriota Scanderbeg, in San Marzano

In 1530, San Marzano was bought by Demetrio Capuzzimati. In 1536, Capuzzimati also acquired in emphyteusis from the clergy of Taranto the adjacent fiefdom "de li Riezzi" (Rizzi), where the medieval Castrum Carrellum was located. For this concession Capuzzimati would have had to pay the Taranto clergy 50 ducats in silver pugs annually. The merger of the two fiefdoms created the current San Marzano. In that period, the territory was populated by numerous Epirote families who, in addition to their language of origin, brought with them their customs, cultural practices and faith to their new homeland. Capuzzimati immediately began the construction of the feudal palace.

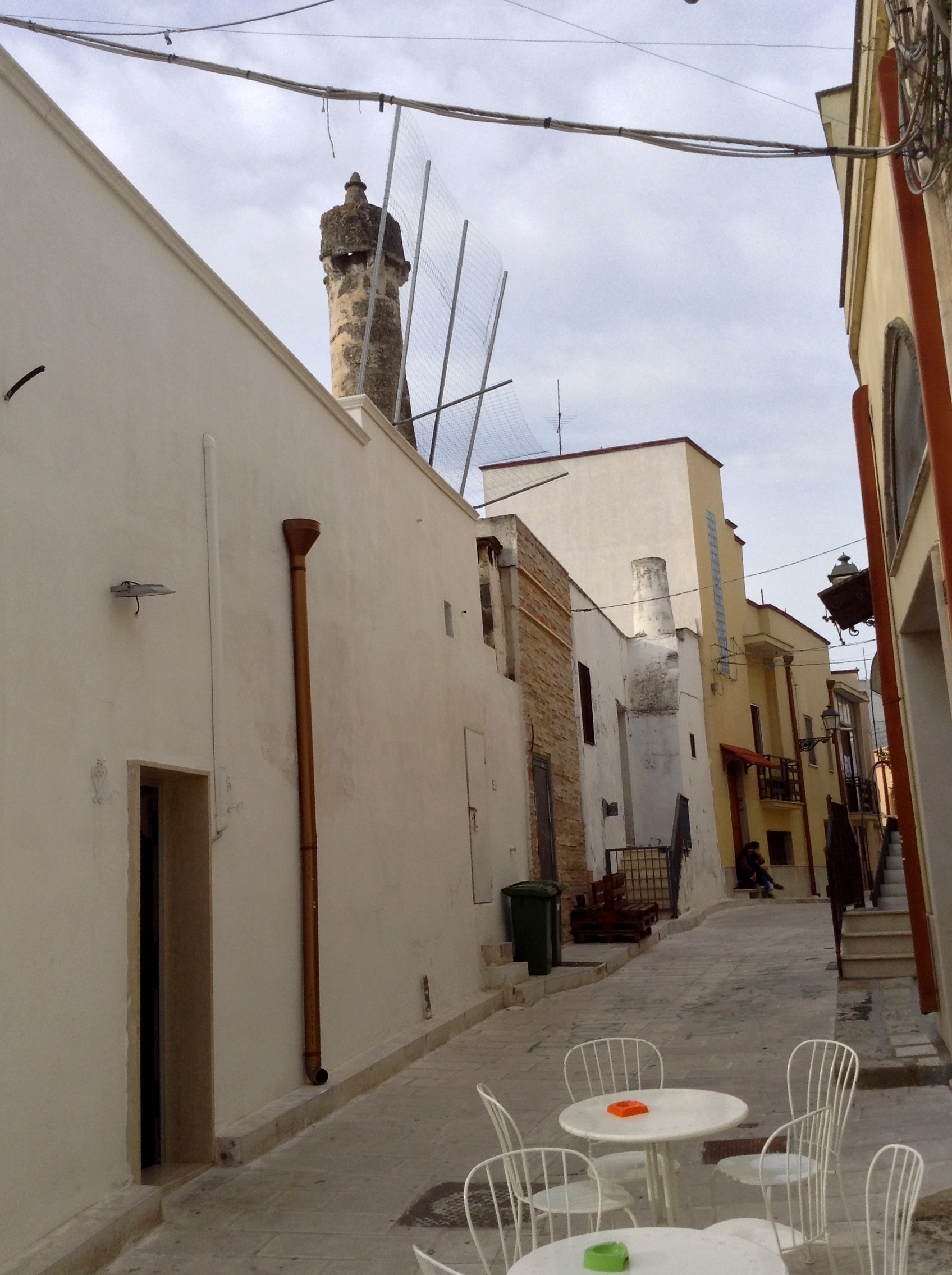
Houses on a street in San Marzano with a traditional Arbëreshe chimney pot

== Geography ==
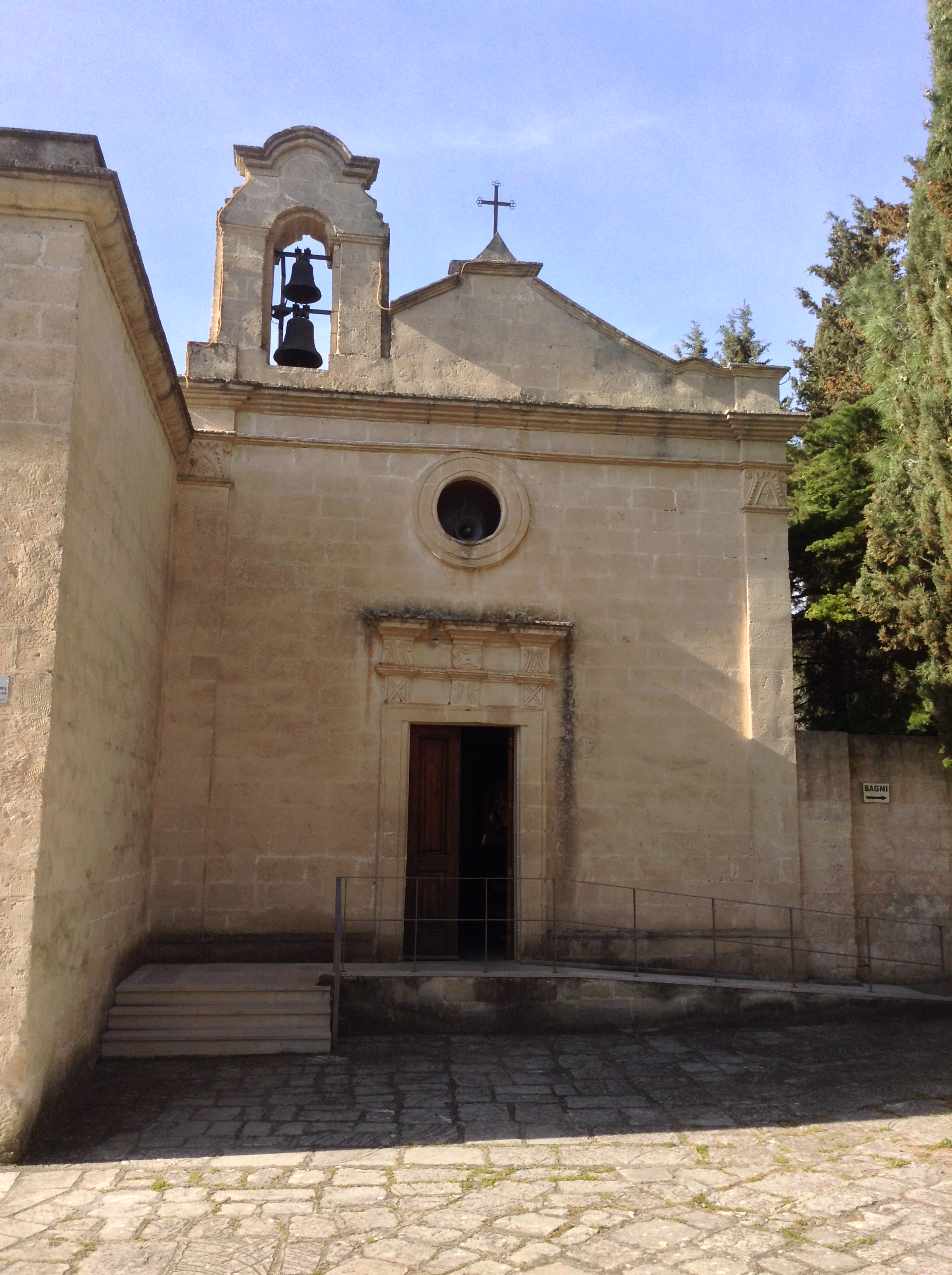
The Church at the Sanctuary of Our Lady of Graces

San Marzano di San Giuseppe is one part of the 50 Albanian municipalities of Italy. The town sprawls in Alto Salento, with an altitude of 134 meters above sea level, on a little hill of the Murge Tarantine. It is approximately 20 km from the Ionian Sea. Its coordinates are 40°27'N, 17°30'E. It is surrounded by Grottaglie, Sava, Fragagnano and Francavilla Fontana. The monuments in San Marzano include the Church of San Carlo Borromeo, the Church of the Addolorata, the Church of San Gennaro, the Church of Madonna delle Grazie and San Giuseppe Church. The gravina near the Madonna delle Grazie is a significant archaeological site in San Marzano. Other sights include San Marzano's historical centre, Trullo del Brigante, Palazzo Capuzzimati, and the murals depicting the workers of San Marzano and Masseria Casa Rossa. In 1575, there were 74 families and 370 people in San Marzano. In 1630 there were 250 people. In 1633 there were 75 families. In 1736 there were 410 people and in 1921 there were 3000 people. As of January 2024, the population of San Marzano di San Giuseppe is 8862.

== Arbëreshe ==
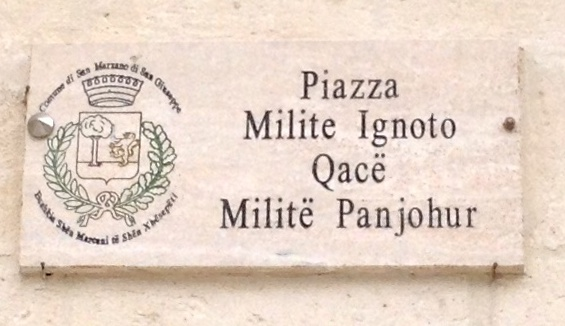
Bilingual sign in Italian and Arbëreshe

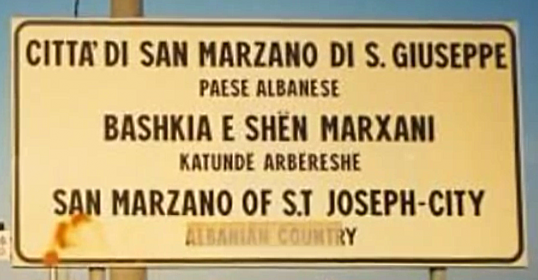
A former San Marzano road sign in three languages (Italian, Arbëreshe & English)

The Arbëreshe language of San Marzano derives from the Tosk dialect. The word Arbëreshe comes from Arbëri the old name for Albania. In the past, Arbëresh was spoken in all Albanian communities in Salento. San Marzano is home to one of the three Arbëreshe communities in Apulia following their exile from Albania in the 16th century. It is the only place on the Salento peninsula where the language has been preserved. Both the Albanian language of Italy, Arbëreshe and the Albanian language of Albania, Shqip, share the same alphabet of 36 letters, 7 vowels and 29 consonants. There are, however, differences in the pronunciation of some letters. The Albanian alphabet was codified by the Congress of Manastir (now Bitola, part of North Macedonia) in 1908. Thirty-two experts from twenty-three cities participated, as well as cultural associations from Albania and various parts of the world, including Italian-Albanian intellectuals. In the middle and elementary schools of San Marzano di San Giuseppe, they also hold educational courses in Arbëresh intending to keep the language alive and to teach future generations to speak it.

== Religion ==
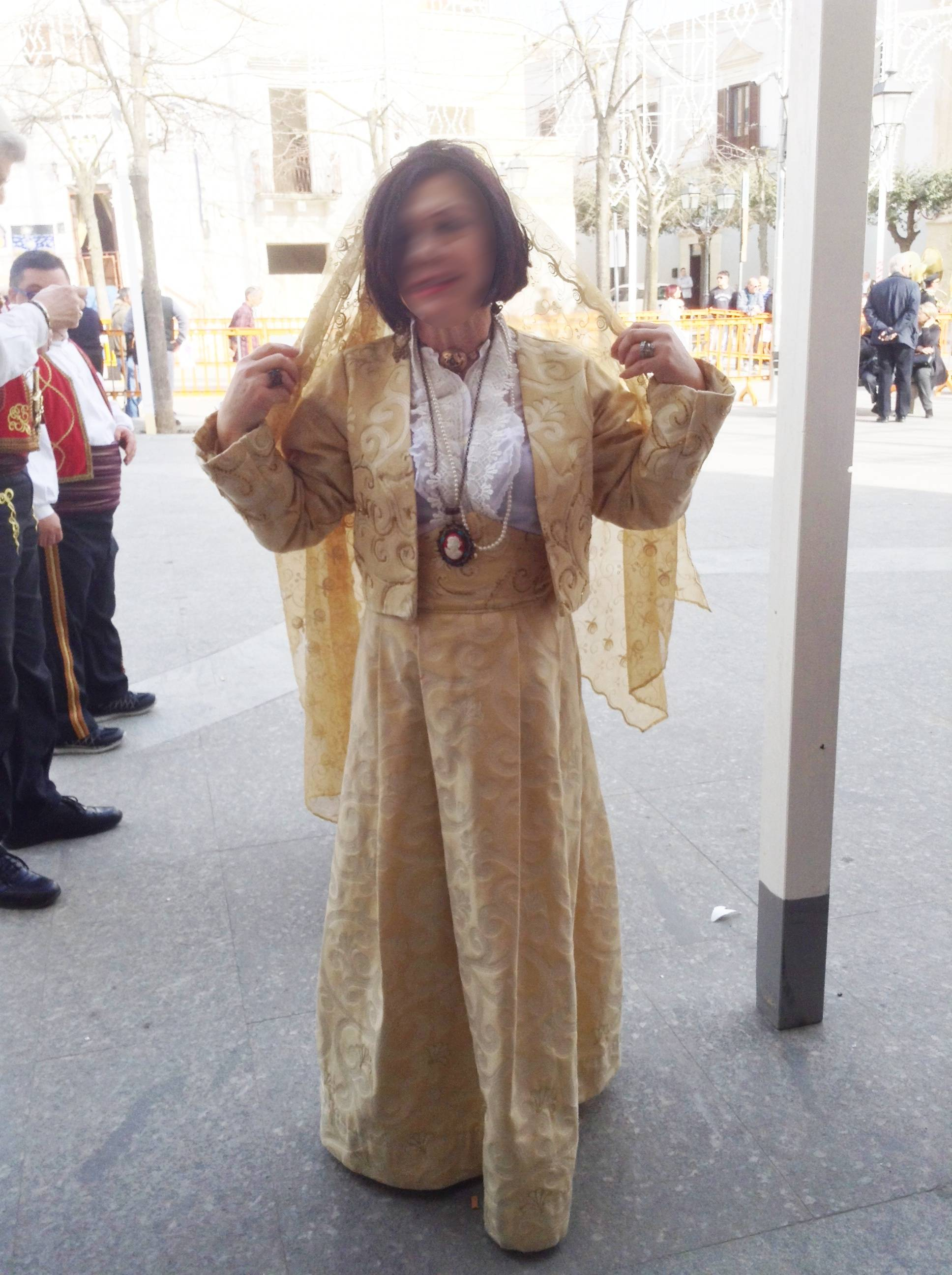
A bride in traditional Arbëreshe dress in San Marzano

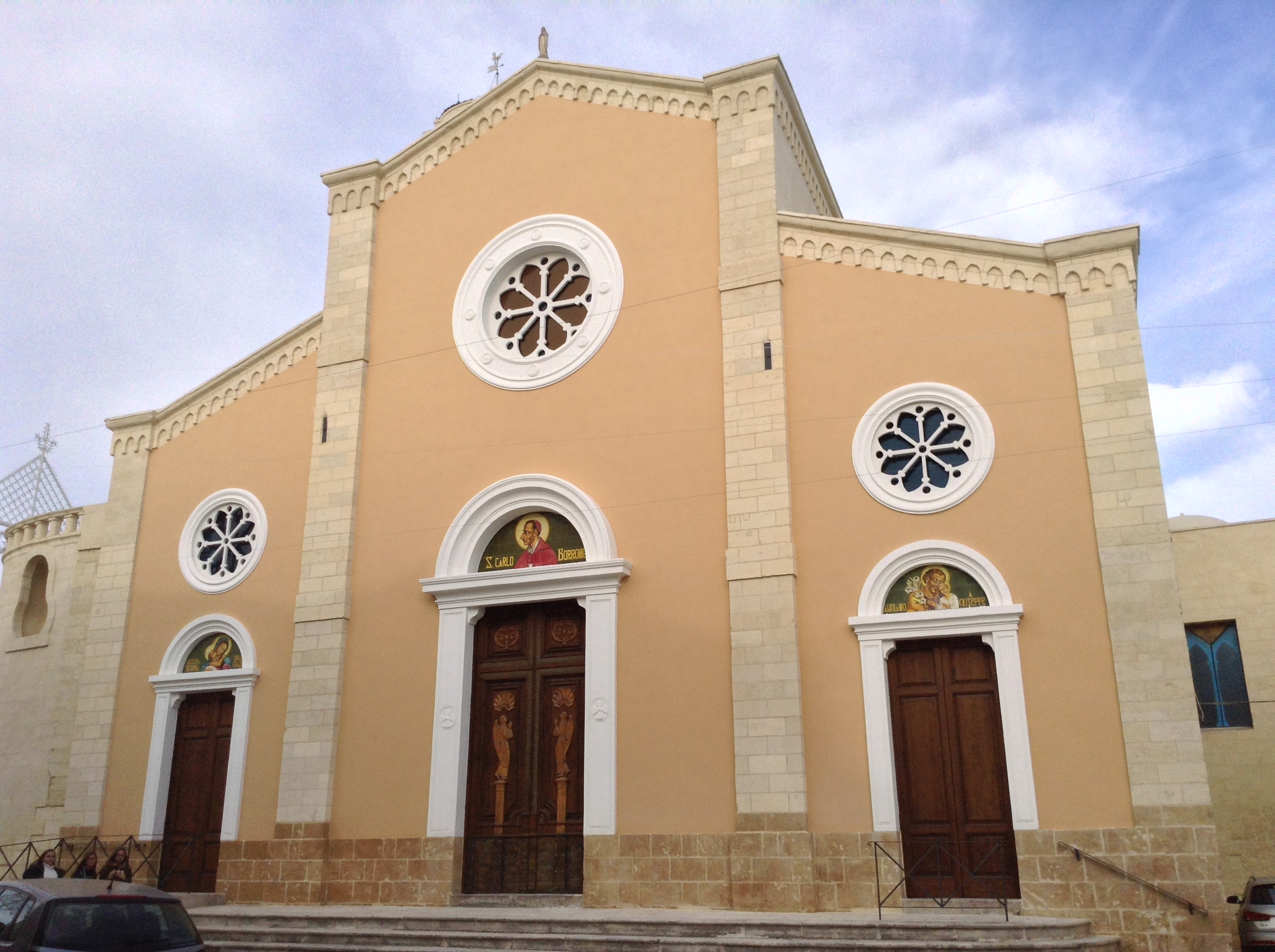
The Church of San Carlo Borromeo

The Albanians who settled in San Marzano originally came from southern Albania and brought with them their Byzantine religious rite. Near today's church of San Carlo Borromeo, the church of the farmhouse dedicated to Santa Parasceva was built according to Greek custom. With the papal bull of 1536, Pope Paul III gave the Albanians in Italy full recognition within the Catholic Church. In a 1575 report to the Holy See of Rome, the Archbishop of Taranto, Lelio Brancaccio, called the Albanians of Albania Tarantina "people without faith and without law". However, on 4th May 1578, San Marzano, a Byzantine-rite community, received its first pastoral visit from Archbishop Brancaccio. The archbishop was received by Papas Demetrius Cabascia, who had been ordained by a passing metropolitan in 1560.

=== Papas ===
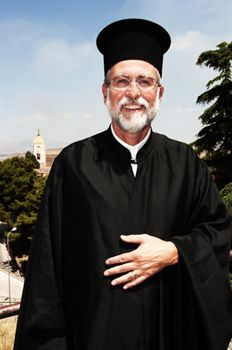
Papàs Kola Kennel from the Arbëreshe Community of Contessa Entellina in Sicily

The Papas (Greek Rite Priests) conduct traditional Arbëreshe marriages. The Papas host married couples outside the church and accompany them inside the church, where he puts crowns decorated with coloured ribbons on their heads. The use of the crown was already attested by the Roman writer Tertullian. Although this custom had weakened over the centuries, its importance to wedding ceremonies can still be seen and the term "crown" continued to indicate the sacrament of marriage. During the Eucharist, the Papas give the newlyweds a piece of bread that they both ate in turn three times and a glass of wine from which both took a sip three times. This custom symbolized fidelity: no one else could drink from the same glass. After this ritual, the bride and groom went around the altar three times and the Papas consecrated the successful union. At the end of the ritual, the Papas threw the glass from which he drank to the couple into the baptismal font. As a good omen, the glass was then broken.

== Festivals ==
=== Saint Joseph’s Day ===
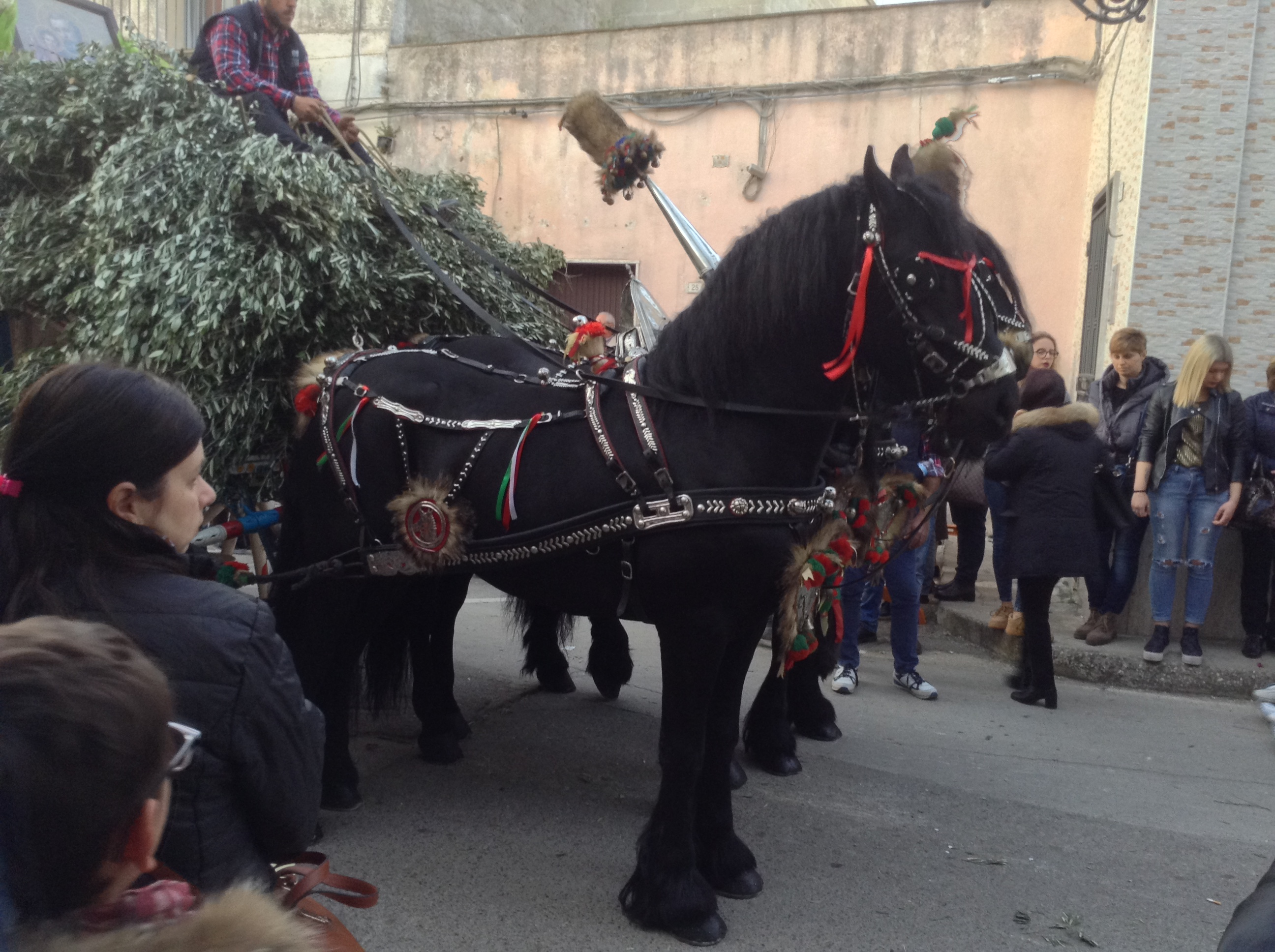
The Procession of the Fascine

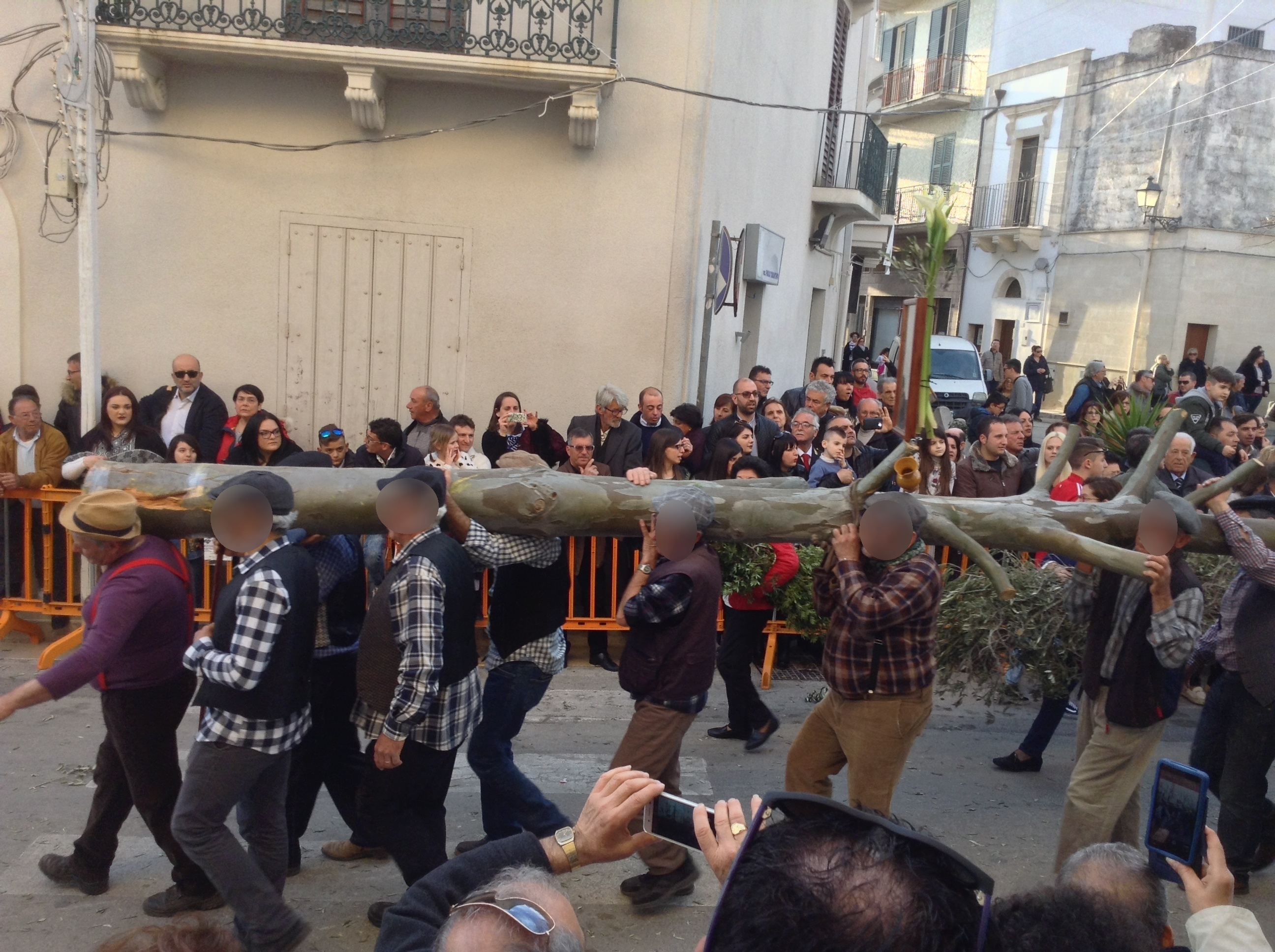
The Procession of the Fascine

In San Marzano di San Giuseppe, Saint Joseph's Day has been celebrated since the 17th century, on the 18th and 19th March. The date coincides with Father's Day and with the season when the olive trees are trimmed. On the first day, people participate in the "Procession of Fascine". The fascine (bundles of olive branches) are transported on foot and by horse and cart through the town. The procession ends with the lighting of a big bonfire.

The local legend behind the bonfire celebration references an instance of the festival in 1866 where, due to low temperatures and harsh conditions, the local community decided not to make any bonfire in honour of the patron saint. Then, during the night between the 17th and 18th of March, the crops were destroyed by a storm. Locals believed that this was an act of punishment by Saint Joseph for not making the bonfire, so from then on, a large bonfire became the central component of the celebrations.

=== The Mattre and Tables of Saint Joseph ===
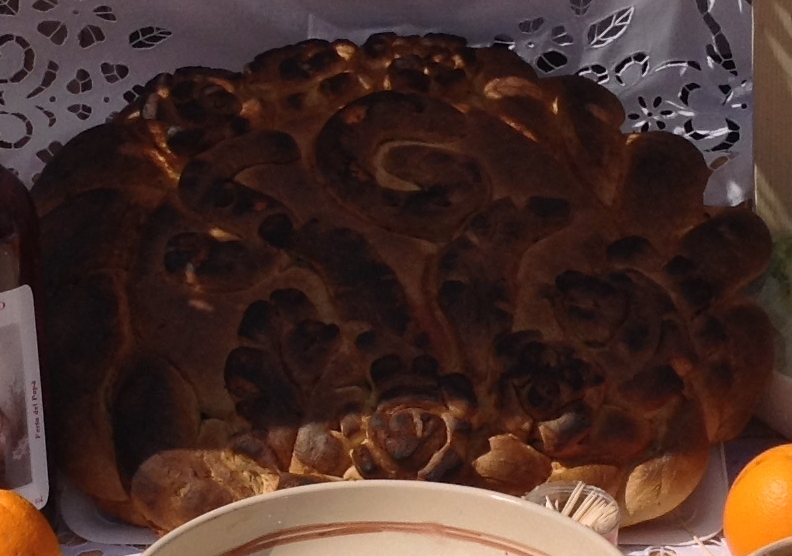
The Bread of Saint Joseph

On the morning of the second day, before the patronal procession, mattre (tables for the poor) are prepared and blessed by the parish priest. The mattre were originally offered to the poorer communities of the town but today it is generally offered to everyone including tourists. The Tables of Saint Joseph, which reference the Last Supper, are also prepared. Thirteen loaves of bread are prepared and set out on tables.

=== Our Lady of Graces ===
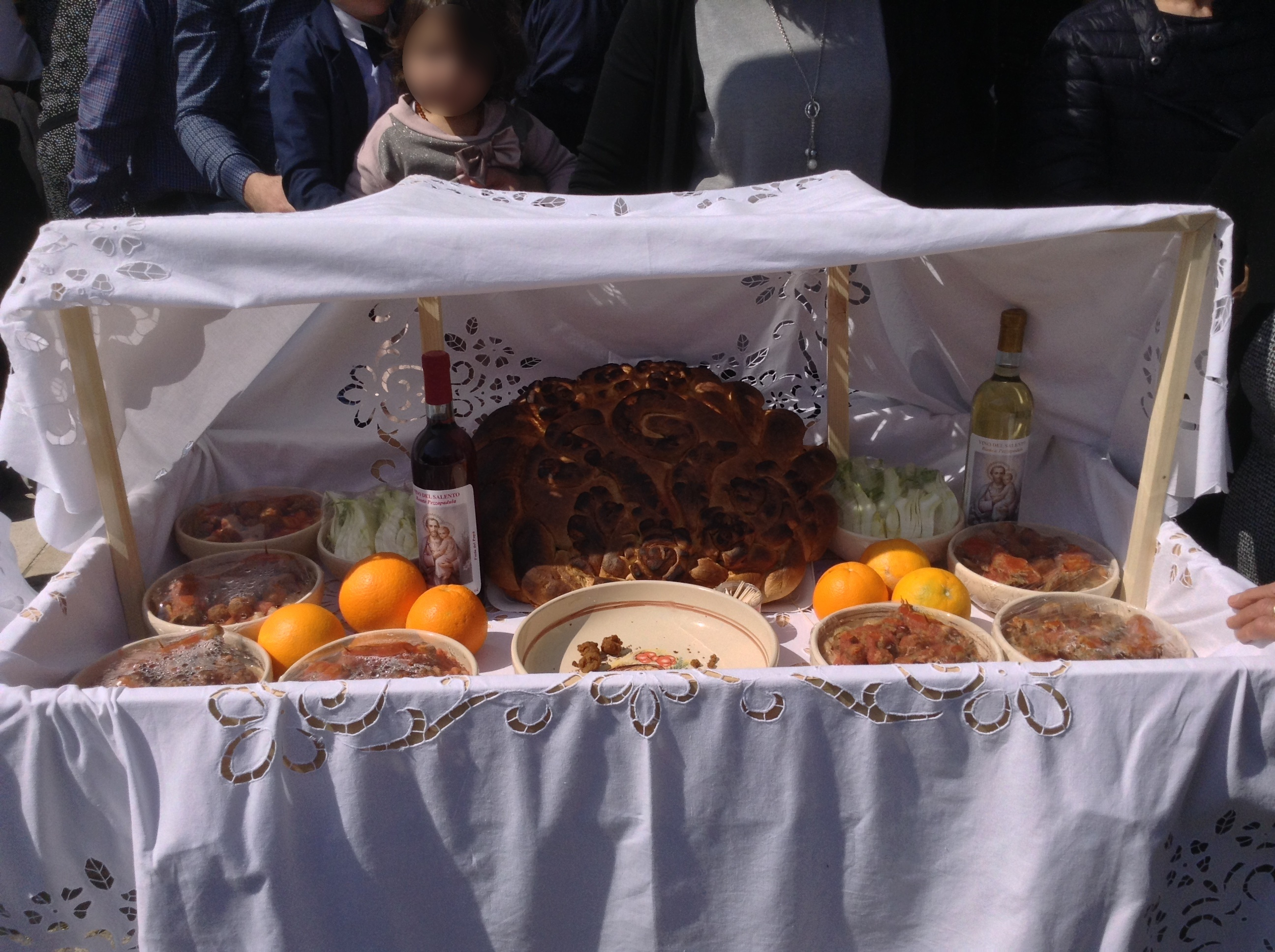
The Mattre

In addition to the patronal feast of Saint Joseph, on the 1st and 2nd of July, the patronage of Our Lady of Graces (Maria Santissima delle Grazie) is celebrated. This festival is held near the Sanctuary of the Madonna delle Grazie, named for the saint herself. The civil and religious authorities of San Marzano partake in a pilgrimage from the town centre to the Sanctuary.

=== MED Festival ===
In August, the MED Festival, which celebrates the wine, food and culture of the town, is held.

== Economy ==
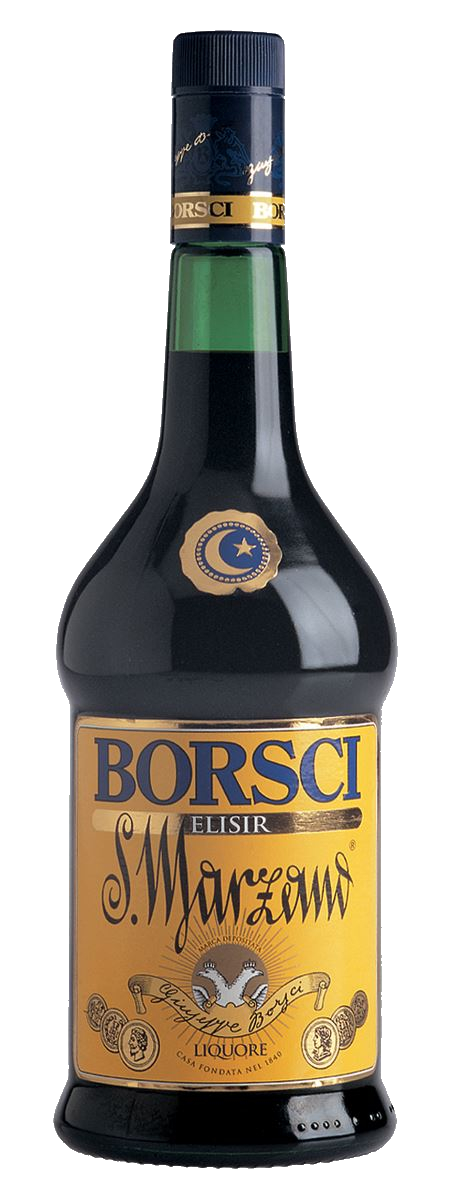
San Marzano Borsci

The economy is largely based on the production of grapes and olives.

The Borsci family distillery has long produced a liqueur called Elisir San Marzano Borsci. The Borsci family originally came from Borsh (in Lukovë, Albania) but moved to Apulia in the medieval period. In 1840, the Italian-Albanian distiller Giuseppe Borsci–based on a recipe inherited from his ancestors–began producing the liqueur. In the 20th century, a distillery was established in the Paolo VI quarter in Taranto. The Borsci family's company suffered during the 2008 financial crisis and as a result, the company was leased to companies from Ostuni and Brescia and filed bankruptcy in 2012. In 2013, the Caffo Distillery was awarded a business lease for the Borsci brand. In 2017, the liquor became the property of Caffo. Today, there are still Borsci family members working for the company, carrying on the family tradition.

The Cantine San Marzano produces wine from local vineyards. The winery was created in 1962 by the union of the 19 San Marzano's wine producers to produce new wines. The Mediterranean terroir plays an important role in the production of the Apulian Primitivo and Negroamaro grapes.

San Marzano also cultivates olives for oil production, namely, extra virgin olive oil.
