= Gaetano Longo =

Italian mass murderer (1865–1900)

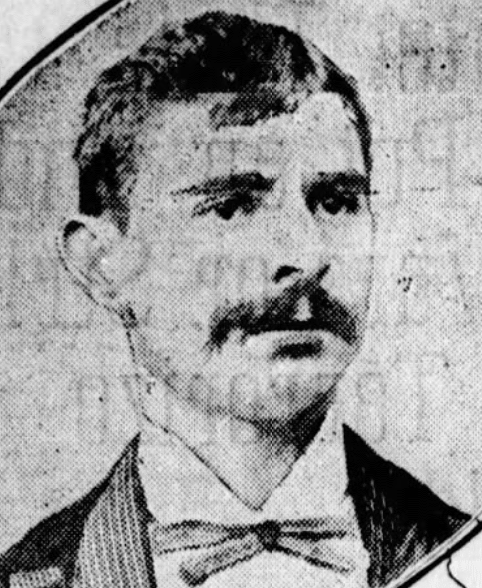
Undated photo of Gaetano Longo

Gaetano Longo (c. 1865 – 14 September 1900) was an Italian man who murdered ten people and injured one other in an hour-long mass shooting in Pastena, Lazio, Kingdom of Italy, on 14 September 1900, after suspecting his wife of infidelity. He remains the worst lone mass shooter in the country's history.

== Background ==
In 1899 or early 1900, ex-soldier Gaetano Longo emigrated to New York, United States, in hopes of improving his living conditions. His wife, Annunziata (c. 1873–1900), was left behind in Italy, with Longo promising to bring her to the U.S. as soon as he was able. While Longo was abroad, Annunziata allegedly had several affairs with different men in their village. Through a letter sent by someone she had slighted, Longo was made aware of this and returned to Italy on 11 June; rather than going home, he spent several weeks in the nearby town of Caserta to gather evidence before enacting revenge.

== Murder spree ==
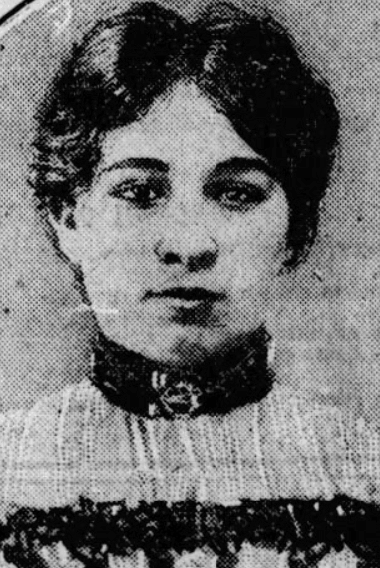
Gaetano's wife, Annunziata

On 14 September 1900, Longo returned to Pastena. His first victim was his wife's alleged lover, a man from a wealthy family named Giovanni Marozzi. Longo waited along Marozzi's usual route and struck up a conversation with him, during which he suddenly pulled a revolver from his pocket and shot Marozzi in the heart, killing him on the spot.

Longo then visited a village washhouse, where his wife and a mutual friend named Luigia worked. Annunziata and Luigia, frightened by Longo's sudden appearance and overly calm demeanor, attempted to run away after being greeted. The women were then chased into a corner and fatally shot, with Annunziata dying from a gunshot wound to the heart.

After murdering his wife, Longo went to a corn field in the nearby village of Ponte Nuovo and shot Giovanni Marozzi's two younger brothers who were working there, Pio and Gaspare. Shortly after, Angela, the wife of Gaspare, brought supper to the field for her husband. Longo knocked her to the ground and shot her in the heart. While walking home through the village, Longo was greeted by Marozzi's sister, Giovannina, who was unaware of what was unfolding. Longo suddenly grabbed her by her braids and shot her in the throat.

Longo, compelled to continue his rampage, visited a farmhouse where the Persicone brothers worked. Although they were friends from childhood, Longo heard rumors that they had attempted to woo his wife while he was gone. Gennaro Persicone, happy to see Longo back from America, went inside to fetch wine, cheese, and bread for them. Longo took a rifle off their wall, and after loading and inspecting it, he shot Gennaro in the chest. Gennaro's parents heard the gunshots and rushed to the scene; both were also immediately shot. One of the parents survived with only a wound to the leg and pursued Longo.

By this time, the village was aware of the murders and who was likely responsible. Around 6 p.m., Longo visited an isolated farmhouse where Fabiana Saraceno, a 26-year-old mother of seven, lived with her husband. Longo met her at a window and yelled, "Curse you, if you had married me when I asked you, my wife wouldn't have betrayed me, and I would be a happy man. Instead, everything is dark around me, and misfortune dogs my footsteps. Give me your hand and say that you are sorry." Fabiana refused and told him that she wouldn't "even shake hands with [him]". Longo replied, "nor with anyone else", and killed her on the spot with his revolver.

Longo, at this point being pursued by many, committed suicide in a cemetery near the location of his first murder. Despite having a bullet lodged in his brain, no weapon was found nearby, leading to speculation that he was murdered by an unknown villager.

== See also ==
- List of mass shootings in Italy
- Simone Pianetti
