= Mirano =

- Comune
- Comune di Mirano
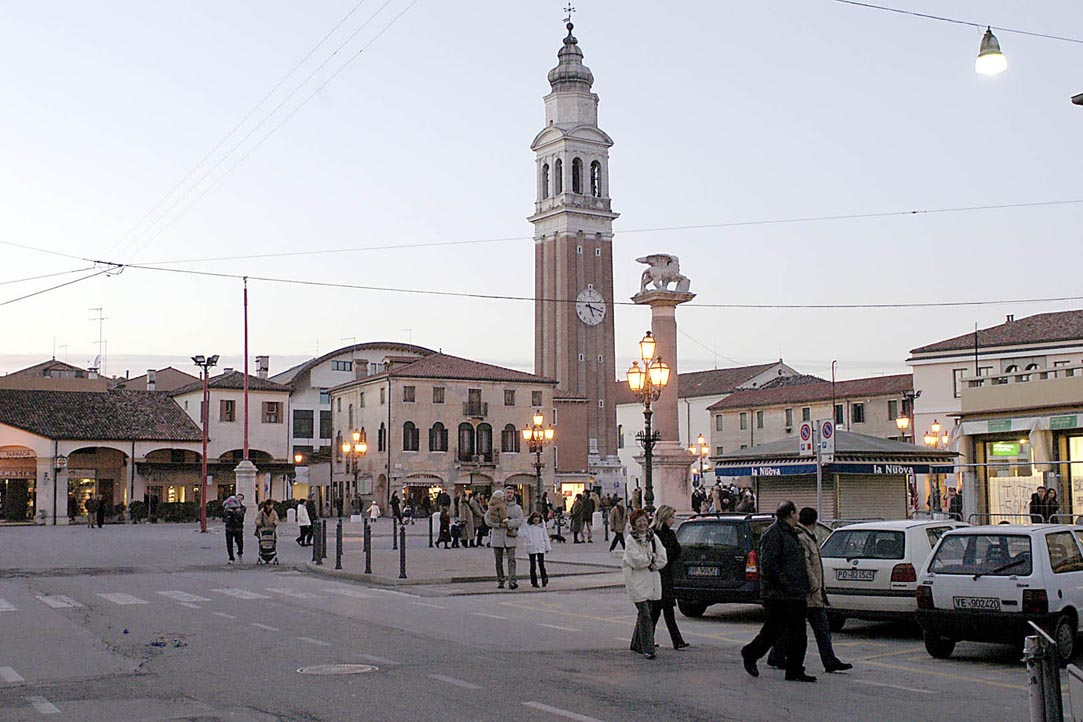
- Town square

- Coat of arms

- Location within Italy Location within Veneto
- Coordinates: 45°30′N 12°6′E
- Country: Italy
- Region: Veneto
- Metropolitan city: Venice (VE)
- Frazioni: Ballò, Campocroce, Scaltenigo, Vetrego, Zianigo

Government
  - Mayor: Tiziano Baggio (PD)

Area
  - Total: 45.62 km^{2} (17.61 sq mi)
- Elevation: 9 m (30 ft)

Population (28 February 2011)
  - Total: 27,083
  - Density: 593.7/km^{2} (1,538/sq mi)
- Demonym: Miranesi
- Time zone: UTC+1 (CET)
  - Summer (DST): UTC+2 (CEST)
- Postal code: 30035
- Dialing code: 041
- Patron saint: Saint Matthew
- Saint day: 21 September
- Website: Official website

Mirano is a town and comune in the Metropolitan City of Venice, Veneto, Italy.

== Toponymy ==
The town's name comes from its ancient Latin name Miranum, derived from mira, meaning "observatory" or "spectacle". This etymology is shared with nearby Mira.

== Geography ==
Mirano is situated in the central-western area of mainland Venice. It is located at 6–12 meters above sea level.

The administrative comune covers 45.62 km^{2} (17.61 sq mi) with a population of 27,083 and a population density of 590 inhabitants per square kilometer (1,500 per square mile).

The landscape is generally flat, and includes man-made canals.

== Culture ==
Each year since 2015, in mid-November, Mirano celebrates St. Martin's Day with the zogo dell'oca—an elaborate goose-themed festival. The tradition connects St. Martin's affinity for geese with Mirano's history: as a town with a significant Jewish and Muslim population, goose was popular as one of the only meats that members of all three religions could safely eat. Participants dress in traditional 19th-century clothing and compete in a life-size homage to the traditional 'game of the goose.'

== Notable people ==
- Luigi Brugnaro (born 1961), politician and current mayor of Venice (since 2015)
- Federica Pellegrini (born 1988), Olympic swimmer, multiple world-record holder and Olympic gold medalist.
- Luigi Milan (born 1937), former Italian footballer.
- Alberto Mondi (born 1984), celebrity in Korea.
- Michele Campagnaro (born 1993), International Rugby Player, Italy and Exeter Chiefs.
