= Andrea Arrigoni (serial killer) =

Italian serial killer

- Born: 13 January 1969; Bergamo, Lombardy, Italy
- Died: 21 February 2005 (aged 36); Verona, Veneto, Italy
- Cause of death: Gunshot wounds

Details
- Victims: 4+
- Span of crimes: 2004–2005
- Country: Italy
- States: Lombardy, Veneto
- Date apprehended: N/A

Andrea Arrigoni (13 January 1969 – 21 February 2005) was an Italian serial killer and former private investigator who killed at least two prostitutes and two police officers in two separate incidents from 2004 to 2005. He was killed in a firefight with police, and was posthumously linked to his first known murder.

== Early life and career ==
Andrea Arrigoni was born in 1969 in Bergamo, the younger of two sons born to marching band director Alberto and volunteer nurse Mariuccia Arrigoni. His family was well-regarded in his hometown due to the fact that both of his parents engaged in volunteer work, and raised their children seemingly without any issues. Whilst growing up, Arrigoni was described as a fun-loving prankster who got along with everyone.

After graduating from a private boarding school in Verona in the early 1990s, Arrigoni enlisted in the Paratroopers Brigade "Folgore" and was soon afterwards stationed in Somalia. After returning home in 1994, he adopted a more serious demeanour and was soon hired as a bodyguard for politician Umberto Bossi. He worked in this profession until 1996, when Bossi dismissed him and the remainder of his bodyguards in favour of a single bodyguard he personally trusted, an action which greatly disappointed Arrigoni.

After this, he got a license as a private investigator and opened his own business in Osio Sotto. Due to his use of video cameras and bugs, Arrigoni became highly respected in his field and was often invited to conferences involving fellow private investigators. Supposedly, he was occasionally tasked with doing industrial counterespionage and similar work by public bodies.

== Murders ==
On 16 November 2004, 26-year-old Albanian prostitute Fatmira Giegji was reported missing from Bergamo. Three days later, her body was found in a canal in Osio Sopra - she had been decapitated and her hands amputated, but this seemed to have been done post-mortem, as the head had a single gunshot wound. Coroners determined that the killer had used a Beretta pistol with 6.35 mm rounds. She was identified via her piercings and a tattoo on her body, but her killer remained elusive for the time being.

=== Shootout and death ===
On 20 February, Arrigoni travelled to Verona, ostensibly to visit his girlfriend, but instead went to a known red-light district to pick up a prostitute. He picked up 30-year-old Ukrainian Galina Shafranek and drove her to another part of town. The pair eventually got into a violent altercation that was notified to the police.

In response two police officers were dispatched to arrest Arrigoni, but by the time they arrived, he had already shot Shafranek in the neck with his pistol. When he noticed the officers approaching, Arrigoni opened fire on them, fatally wounding 36-year-old Davide Turazza and 26-year-old Giuseppe Cimarrusti. The officers, though wounded, were able to return fire, killing Arrigoni. The gravely injured Shafranek was taken to a hospital, but succumbed to her injuries.

== Investigation ==
In the aftermath of the shootout, local authorities raided Arrigoni's apartment and office in search of anything that could provide a motive for the attack. During the search, they recovered ammunition for a Beretta using 6.35 mm rounds and handed it over to the forensic team for analysis. To their surprise, it was revealed to be the murder weapon used to kill Giegji several months prior.

This revelation led the local police department to officially label him a serial killer, as well as prompting them to investigate whether he could be responsible for other unsolved murders committed around Italy. At some point it was suggested that Arrigoni might have been the perpetrator of the Piazzale Dateo murders, an unsolved triple murder committed in Milan on December 31, 1999. The victims in that case - 29-year-old Brazilian transvestite Paulo Barboza dos Santos, his 51-year-old "friend" Pierfranco Talgati and 27-year-old Sri Lankan passer-by Clement Wattoru Tantirige - were all shot with a weapon using 9×21mm rounds used by law enforcement. In addition, it was determined that the killer had committed various thefts and robberies using a stolen black Porsche that was later found burned down. As of February 2023, the crime remains unsolved and it is unclear if Arrigoni has been eliminated as a suspect.

=== Aftermath ===
Arrigoni's motives for the murders remain unclear. Hypotheses have ranged from him being a pimp to being a government spy seeking information in violent ways. In an interview given in 2013, Arrigoni's family members stated that they still believe that he would never do such a thing and that more must be done to completely unravel what had happened on the day of the shootings.

In 2016, Turazza's daughter Nicol gave an interview about the massacre and how her father's death affected her. She is now a law student and has considered becoming a policewoman like her father, but has said that the profession is not necessarily her priority.

== See also ==
- List of serial killers by country
