= Vetrego =

Settlement in Mirano, Veneto, Italy

Coordinates: 45°27′30″N 12°6′16″E

Vetrego is a frazione of the comune of Mirano, Italy, Province of Venice, Region Veneto.

== Background ==
- Vetrego has approximately 1216 inhabitants.
- It is a parish of Roman Catholic Diocese of Treviso with patron Saint Pope Sylvester I (31 December).
- The gentilic is Vetreghesi.
- The Area codes in Italy is: 041.
- The postal code is: 30030 Scaltenigo.
- Elevation: 3–6 meters.

== Name ==
Today, after the findings of archaeological, we are sure that Vetrego existed in the 1st century AD. If you accredits the view of some scholars demonstrating that the Roman "graticolato" came up on the margins of the Venetian Lagoon, then existed in the country early Venetian era. It seems to be valid, the argument that Vetrego comes from "Vetus Vicus" (Old Village).

== Territory ==
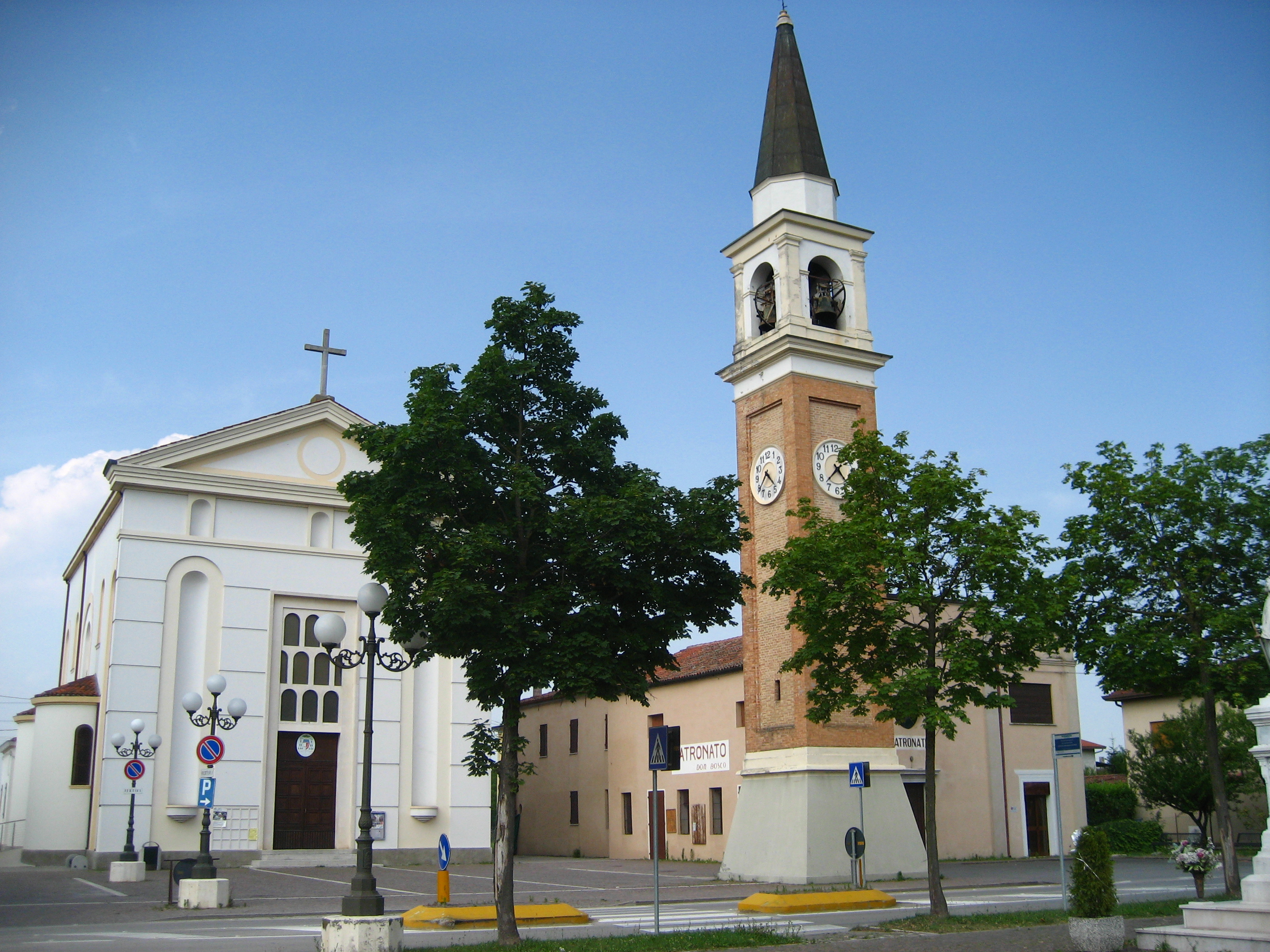
The square

The unit of measurement used for agricultural Vetrego are the "campo", field: "Paduan field" (3862.57 square meters) or "field Treviso" (5204.69 square meters).

The territory borders of the hamlet with fractions of: Marano Veneziano (Municipality of Mira, Italy ), Mirano, the location Formigo of Scaltenigo, Ballò, the location of Cazzago Roncoduro (Municipality of Pianiga), the location of Mira Taglio, Molinella, Mira.

The territory of Vetrego has been cut off from the general infrastructure to service the capital (Venice): to the north is the Venice-Milan railway, to the south by motorway "A4", east is the Taglio Nuovo, artificial channel of the "Muson Vecchio" river, with Cuccobello as a separate location, creating a tiny enclave in the town of Mira.

The government of water ( rivers: Muson, Brenta and Tergola) and all the many artificial channels (Cognaro, Comuna, Comunetto, Cesenègo, Volpin, Pionca) that the cross, has always been crucial to the survival of the hamlet.

== History ==
The Christian organization Vetrego to begin, according to some conclusions and findings, 1008, a chapel "(that is devoid of a church baptismal font, usually a branch of a Church which depend mother Vicars ) located in the resort Ca' Rezzonico, which was built by the monks of St. Benedict of Abbey Sant'Ilario Venice Malcontenta . A brief description of the territory of Vetrego it tracks for the first time in the sales of June 15, 1117 with which Ansedisio and Widoto Collalto family accounts of Bishop of Treviso take the monastery of Sant'Ilario different properties. Then there is a legacy Testament, 1192 countess Speronella Dalesmanni, the first wife of Jacopino Carrara, "lord" of the Bishop of Padua, for the chapel of San Silvestro Vetrego and San Bartolomeo Ballò.

In 1260, friars of Sant'Ilario ceded the organization of the chapel Vetrego, along with the chapels of Ballò and Scaltenigo, "pieve" (i.e. the church of the Middle Ages which church baptismal matrix of all the churches and smaller chapels subject) of "Santa Maria" of Borbiago, the fraction of Mira (VE), the Bishop of Diocese of Treviso. Subsequently, the chapels of Ballò and Vetrego is lived in 1305 from parish Borbiago of creating a new parish, to Ballò, employed by the Bishop of Treviso. There are documents that show the 1388 Bartholomew Novello, lord of Padua gave to the lords of Peraga family, among other items of the area, the territory of Vetrego. The years later Vetrego followed the territories and communities, in submission to the Republic of Venice. Regarding Vetrego is certified in 1520, the first visit by the bishop of Treviso. Following the wishes of small communities in 1573 was built, the site of the church, the first "house for vicar" In 1597 was the second church. In 1612 finished the excavation of Taglio Nuovo Canal of Mirano, started in 1604 with the complete diversion of the waters of the river Muson.
