= Sava, Apulia =

Sava
- Comune
- Comune di Sava
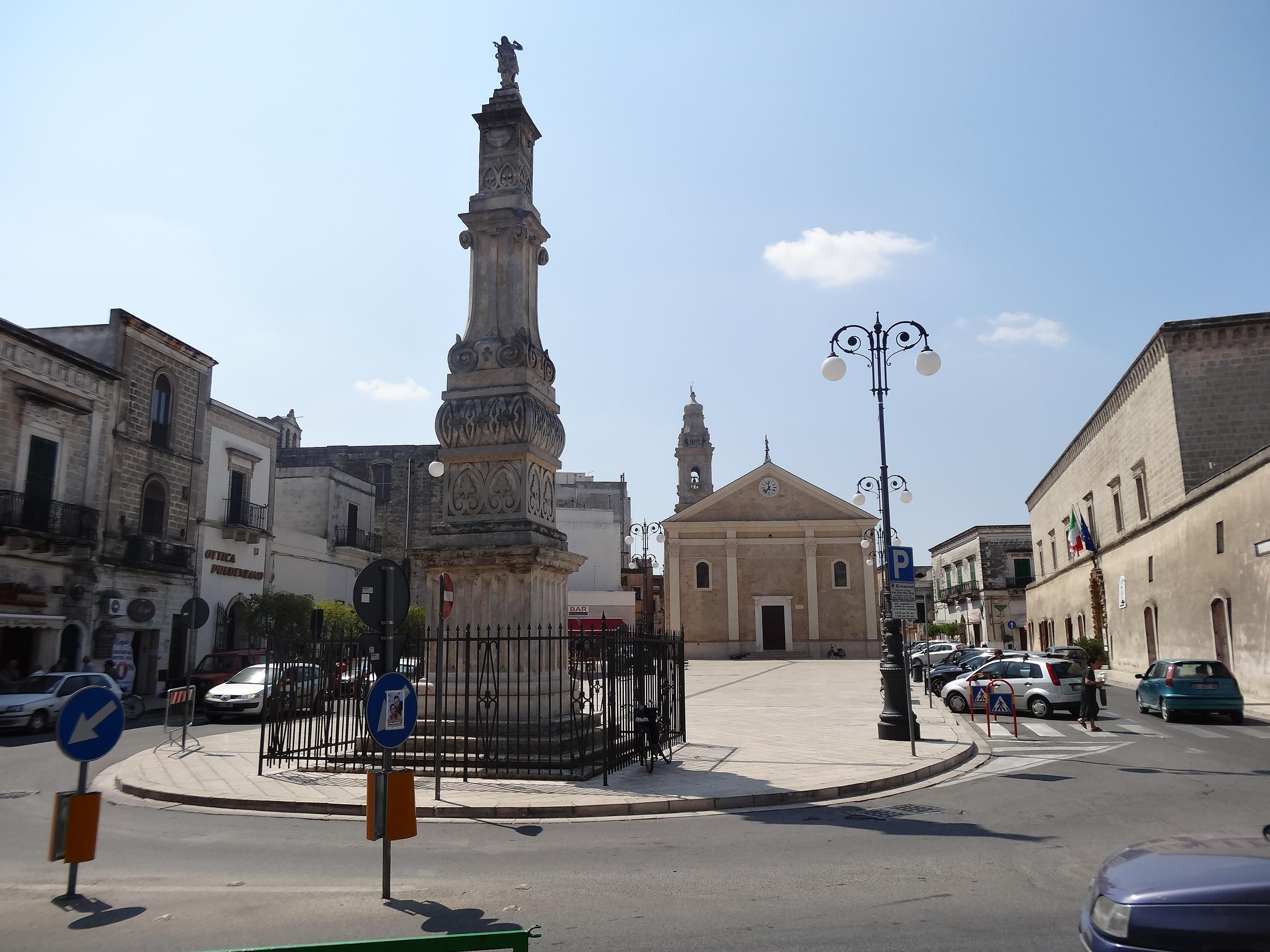
- Town square at Sava

- Coat of arms

- Location within Italy Location within Apulia
- Coordinates: 40°24′N 17°34′E
- Country: Italy
- Region: Apulia
- Province: Taranto (TA)
- Frazioni: Pasàno, Archignàno, Torre

Government
  - Mayor: Gaetano Pichierri

Area
  - Total: 44.57 km^{2} (17.21 sq mi)
- Elevation: 108 m (354 ft)

Population (31 December 2012)
  - Total: 16,490
  - Density: 370.0/km^{2} (958.2/sq mi)
- Demonym: Savesi
- Time zone: UTC+1 (CET)
  - Summer (DST): UTC+2 (CEST)
- Postal code: 74028
- Dialing code: 099
- Patron saint: San Giovanni Battista
- Saint day: 23 and 24 June
- Website: Official website

Sava is a town and comune in the province of Taranto, Apulia, southeast Italy. With its 19000 inhabitants, is one of the biggest town in the province.

It is a center of production of olive oil and of the wine Primitivo.

The nearby comuni are Maruggio, Torricella, Lizzano, Fragagnano, San Marzano di San Giuseppe, Francavilla Fontana and Manduria.

The main monuments of the city are the Mother Church, the Palazzo Baronale, the Mater Domini's Church, the Monastery's Church, the San Cosimo's Church and San Luigi's Church.

== History ==
Some of the finds of the district of Agliano, dating from around 300 BC, attest to the Greek presence in the present territory of Sava. It was probably the last outpost towards the southern Salento, populated by Messapi. At the end of the 7th century AD, with the division of the Apulia region between Byzantines and Lombards, a wall built in dry limestone of modest size was built here. This limes ran from the Adriatic coast south of Brindisi up to the Ionian coast.

Although there are no documents proving the origins of the village of Sava, the majority of local historians agree that its foundation dates from the 15th century.

Sava, as the neighboring municipalities, has been characterized for most of the 20th century by emigration to northern Italy and, to a lesser extent, toward northern Europe.

On 21 September 1897 an F4 tornado impacted the town and dealt major damages, with at least 21 buildings destroyed in the town and multiple deaths. Severe damage was also done to the neighbouring town of Oria.

On 19 August 1976 a powerful tornado struck the city of Sava and the surrounding countryside, until exhausting near Manduria; its passage led to intense rainfall and strong winds that caused extensive damage.
