= Charles L. Keyser =

American Episcopal bishop (1930–2022)

Right Reverend Charles L. Keyser
- Diocese: Episcopal Diocese of the Armed Services and Federal Ministries
- Retired: February 29, 2000
- Predecessor: Charles L. Burgreen
- Successor: George Elden Packard

Orders
- Ordination: by Frank Juhan
- Consecration: March 24, 1990

Personal details
- Born: January 19, 1930 Greenville, South Carolina
- Died: July 31, 2022 (aged 92)
- Denomination: Episcopal

Charles Lovett Keyser (January 19, 1930 – July 31, 2022) was the fourth bishop suffragan for the Armed Forces and Federal Prisons in the Episcopal Church. He was consecrated on March 24, 1990, and retired on February 29, 2000, when he served as an assisting bishop in the Episcopal Diocese of Florida.

Keyser earned a B.A. degree from The University of the South in 1951. In 1954, he received his M.Div. degree from St. Luke's Seminary in Sewanee, Tennessee. On February 15, 1955, Keyser was ordained an Episcopal priest by Bishop Frank Juhan in Jacksonville, Florida. On February 20, 1956, he was commissioned as a reserve officer in the U.S. Navy Chaplain Corps. Keyser served on USS Pocono from December 1964 to June 1967. He was promoted to commander on April 1, 1967. Keyser later served with the 1st Marine Division in Vietnam from June 1969 to July 1970. He was promoted to captain on July 1, 1973.

Keyser was the last armed forces bishop for the Episcopal Church to have objections raised at his consecration by the Episcopal Peace Fellowship.

== See also ==
- List of Episcopal bishops of the United States
- Historical list of the Episcopal bishops of the United States
