= Jerusalem cross =

Heraldic and Christian symbol

A Jerusalem cross based on a cross potent, as commonly seen in early modern heraldry)

The national flag of Georgia

The Jerusalem cross, also known as the five-fold cross, the cross-and-crosslets or the Crusader's cross, is a heraldic cross and Christian cross variant consisting of a large cross potent surrounded by four smaller Greek crosses, one in each quadrant, representing the Four Evangelists and the spread of the gospel to the four corners of the Earth.

It was used as the coat of arms of the Crusader Kingdom of Jerusalem after 1099. Use of the Jerusalem Cross by the Order of the Holy Sepulchre and affiliated organizations in Jerusalem continue to the present. Other modern usages include on the national flag of Georgia and the Episcopal Church Service Cross.

== Origins ==
According to Father David Grenier, a Catholic priest and member of the religious order the Holy Land Franciscan Friars, which uses the Jerusalem Cross as its symbol, the cross originated in Eastern Christianity sometime in the fifth and sixth centuries and was later adopted by crusaders and the Christian Kingdom of Jerusalem from 1099 to 1291. The symbolism of the five-fold cross is variously given as the five holy wounds, Christ and the four evangelists, or Christ and the four quarters of the world. The symbolism of five crosses representing the Five Wounds is first recorded in the context of the consecration of the St Brelade's Church under the patronage of Robert of Normandy, before 1035. The crosses are incised in the church's altar stone.

The "cross-and-crosslets" or Tealby pennies minted under Henry II of England during 1158–1180 have the "Jerusalem cross" on the obverse, with the four crosslets depicted as decussate (diagonal). Similar cross designs on the obverse of coins go back to at least the Anglo-Saxon period.

As the coat of arms of the Kingdom of Jerusalem, the design is traditionally attributed to Godfrey of Bouillon himself. It was not used, however, by the Christian rulers of Jerusalem during the 12th century. A simple blazon of or, a cross argent is documented by Matthew Paris as the coat of arms of John of Brienne, who had been king of Jerusalem during 1210–1212, upon John's death in 1237.

The emblem used on the seals of the rulers of Jerusalem during the 12th century was a simplified depiction of the city itself, showing the tower of David between the Dome of the Rock and the Holy Sepulchre, surrounded by the city walls. Coins minted under Henry II of Champagne (r. 1192–1197) show a cross with four dots in the four quarters, but the Jerusalem cross proper appears only on a coin minted under John I of Cyprus (r. 1284–1285).

At about the same time, the cross of Jerusalem in gold on a silver field appears as the coat of arms of the Kingdom of Jerusalem in early armorials such as the Camden Roll. The coat of arms of the king of Jerusalem featured gold on silver (in the case of John de Brienne, silver on gold), a metal on a metal, breaking the heraldic Rule of Tincture. This was justified by the fact that Jerusalem was so holy, it was above ordinary rules. The gold and silver were also connected to Psalms 68:13, which mentions a "dove covered in silver, and her feathers with yellow gold".

The Gelre Armorial (14th century) attributes to the "emperors of Constantinople" (the Latin Empire) a variant of the Jerusalem cross with the four crosslets inscribed in circles. Philip of Courtenay, who held the title of Latin Emperor of Constantinople from 1273 to 1283 (even though Constantinople had been reconquered by the Byzantine Empire in 1261) used an extended form of the Jerusalem cross, where each of the four crosslets was itself surrounded by four smaller crosslets (a "Jerusalem cross of Jerusalem crosses").

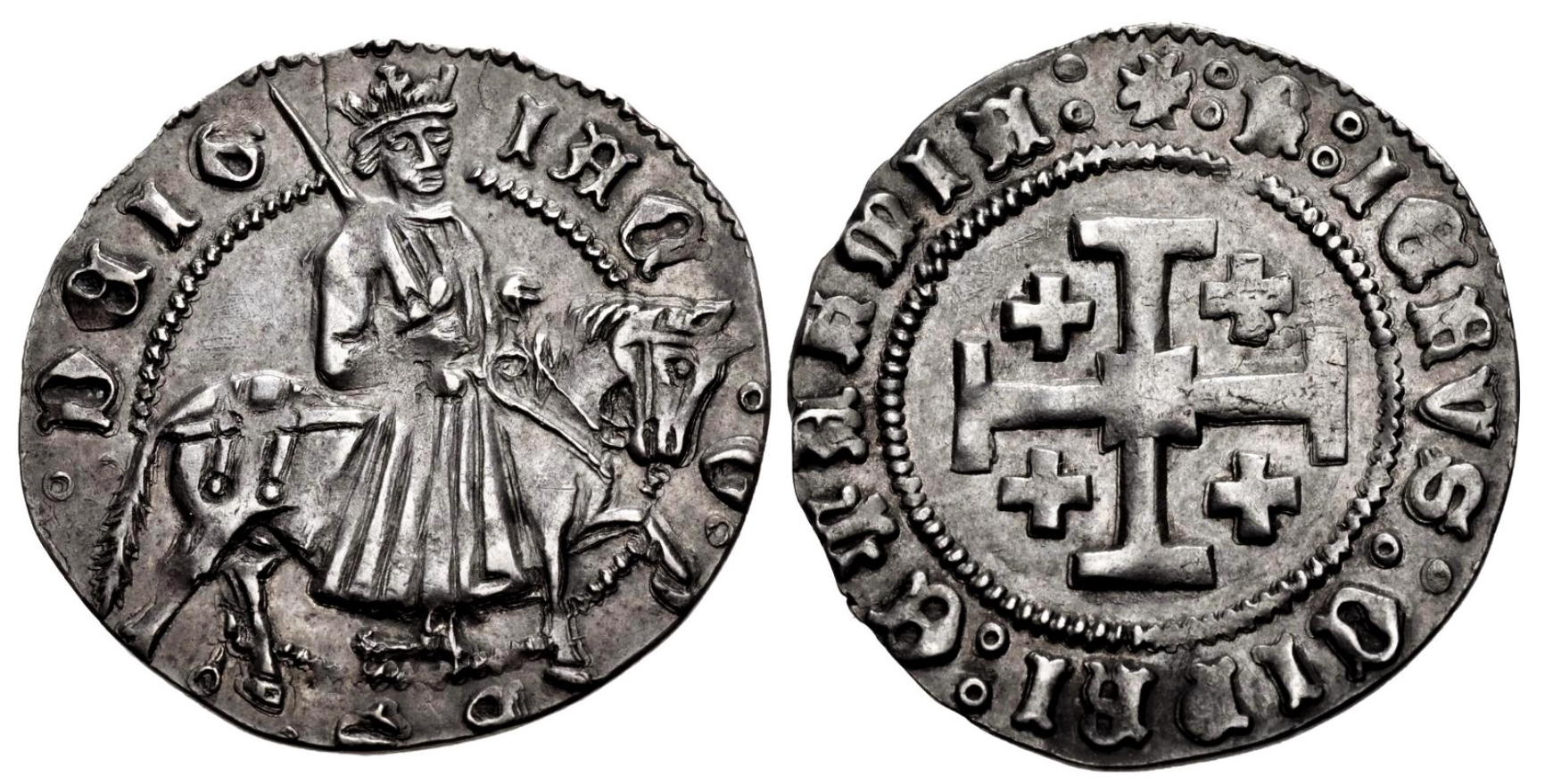
The Jerusalem cross on a silver coin of James II of Cyprus (1463–1473)

Jerusalem cross of five Greek crosses (late medieval variant)

The conventional coat of arms of the Kingdom of Jerusalem

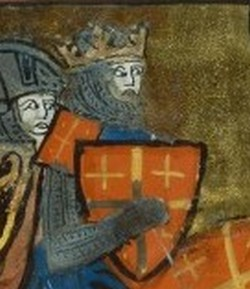
The Jerusalem cross on a red (rather than silver) shield as the coat of arms of Godfrey of Bouillon in a 14th-century miniature

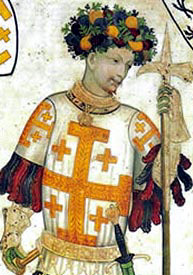
Godfrey of Bouillon in a fresco of the Nine Worthies at the Castello della Manta, c. 1420

== Classical heraldry ==
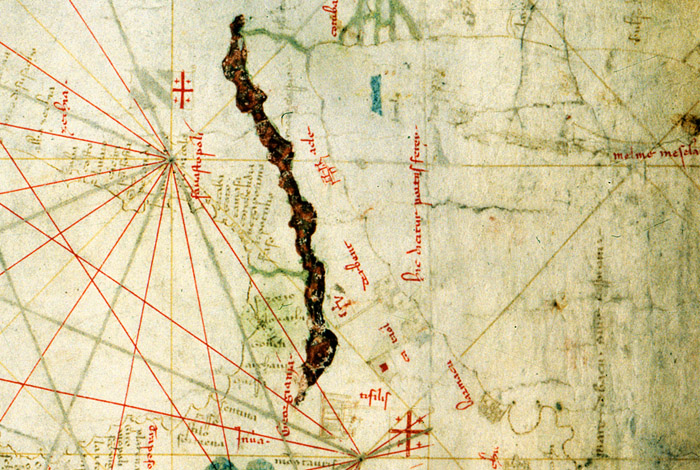
Detail of the 1339 Dulcert chart, showing Georgia and its flag

In late medieval heraldry, the Jerusalem cross or Crusader's cross was used for various Crusader states. The 14th-century Book of All Kingdoms uses it as the flag of Sebasteia. The Pizzigano chart, dating from about the same time, uses it as the flag of Tbilisi.

Carlo Maggi, a Venetian nobleman who visited Jerusalem and was made a knight of the Order of the Holy Sepulchre in the early 1570s, included the Jerusalem cross in his coat of arms.

There is a historiographical tradition that Peter the Great flew a flag with a variant of the Jerusalem cross in his campaign in the White Sea in 1693.

Joan of Arc reportedly told the Inquisition that the location of a sword with five crosses had been revealed to her, and that the Priests of Fierbois had found the sword in the location she described and sent it to her. Following a local tradition that the sword was a relic of Charles Martel, some have speculated the five crosses on the blade may have been the Jerusalem Cross.

== Modern use ==
Many Christians, especially those with a particular connection to Jerusalem or who have made a pilgrimage to the city, choose to wear the Jerusalem Cross or have it tattooed on their bodies as a way to express their faith, commemorate their visit, or display their affiliation with the Christian tradition. Author Jennifer Greenberg adds, "the cross continues to be worn by pastors and to adorn Bibles and Christian books."

"The cross has been ubiquitous in Christian imagery ever since. It appears in the artistic and architectural ornamentation of churches and Christian buildings, as a design on Bible covers and very often as a beautiful piece of jewelry worn to declare one's Christian faith" according to Matthew Bunson, senior fellow of the St. Paul Center for Biblical Theology. He adds "Today, the Jerusalem Cross is still the main insignia of the Latin Patriarchate of Jerusalem—the Latin Catholic diocese for the Holy Land—the Custody of the Holy Land run by the Franciscan Order, and the Equestrian Order of the Holy Sepulchre of Jerusalem."

Vestments worn by Roman Catholic clergy at Church of All Nations, Jerusalem, 2011

Today, it appears in various contexts, from religious symbols to artistic representations, many individuals and communities embrace this emblem as a part of their spiritual identity. In the Christian community, the cross serves as a potent symbol of faith and connection to heritage. Churches across the world display it prominently within their sanctuaries. Such visibility reinforces the significance of pilgrimage and spirituality tied to Jerusalem itself.

According to Matthew Gabriele, a Virginia Tech medieval studies professor, the Jerusalem Cross is not a common Christian symbol today. No. 1 Squadron of the Royal Australian Air Force displays the Jerusalem cross on its squadron crest, although without crosslets, in honor of pilot Frank McNamara's actions in Palestine during the First World War.

When Albert Edward, Prince of Wales, later King Edward VII, visited Jerusalem in 1862, he had a Jerusalem cross tattooed on his arm. Twenty years later, his son George V made a similar journey and had a tattoo of the Jerusalem Cross to commemorate his experience. George wrote of the experience "I was tattooed by the same man who tattooed Papa."

German Emperor Wilhelm II visited Jerusalem in 1898 and awarded the Jerusalem-Erinnerungskreuz (Jerusalem Memorial Cross) order in the shape of a Jerusalem cross to those who accompanied him at the inauguration of the Lutheran Church of the Redeemer, Jerusalem.

In the early 20th century, the Jerusalem cross also came to be used as a symbol of world evangelization in Protestantism. A derived design known as the "Episcopal Church Service Cross" was first used during World War I by the Anglican Episcopal Church in the United States. The Jerusalem cross was chosen as the emblem of the Deutscher Evangelischer Kirchentag (German Protestant Church Assembly) in the 1950s, since the 1960s shown in a simplified form where the central Cross potent is replaced by a simple Greek cross.

The modern national flag of Georgia was introduced in 2004, with a design based on the 14th century Pizzigani chart's use of the cross as the flag of Tbilisi.

The Jerusalem cross is also the symbol of Kairos, a four-day Jesuit retreat that is held for youth in high schools and parishes around the world. The four crosses are used to symbolize the motto of the retreat, "Live the fourth".

The Unicode character set has a character ☩, U+2629 CROSS OF JERUSALEM in the Miscellaneous Symbols table. However, the glyph associated with that character according to the official Unicode character sheet is shown as a simple cross potent, and not a Jerusalem cross.

=== Science ===
The Jerusalem cross is often used in frequency selective surface applications. The Jerusalem cross is an attractive choice for the periodic element because such a choice makes the frequency selective surface less sensitive to angle of incidence.

The president and executive director of the Center for Peace Diplomacy said the cross used in combination with "Deus Vult" are "an invocation of the claim that crusader violence and its atrocities (including the massacre of civilians) was legitimate". Podcaster Brad Onishi stated the Jerusalem cross and the Deus Vult are "symbols that are used by white Christian nationalists. Those who have adopted these Crusader images really see themselves as at war with those trying to take down American Christianity and Western civilization at large."

In 2020, Democrat Tom Steyer made news when he showed up with the hand-drawn symbol on his hand during Democratic debates in 2020. He explained that he drew the cross on his hand for years as a reminder to stay honest.

==== Tattoos and patches during the war on terror ====
In 2024, Pete Hegseth said concerns over his Jerusalem cross tattoo caused the District of Columbia National Guard to pull him from a mission to guard the inauguration of President Joe Biden and helped spur him to resign from the military.

Ben Roberts-Smith has a large Jerusalem cross tattooed on his chest. He also wore a "Crusader cross" patch on his uniform while deployed in Afghanistan. This patch was edited out of photos of him that were widely published from 2011 to 2021. The original version of the photo was obtained by The Sydney Morning Herald and The Age in 2021.

== See also ==
- Jerusalem cube
- Reconquista
- War on terror
