= Monopoli =

Monopoli Menòpele (Neapolitan) Monópoli (Greek)
- Comune
- Città di Monopoli
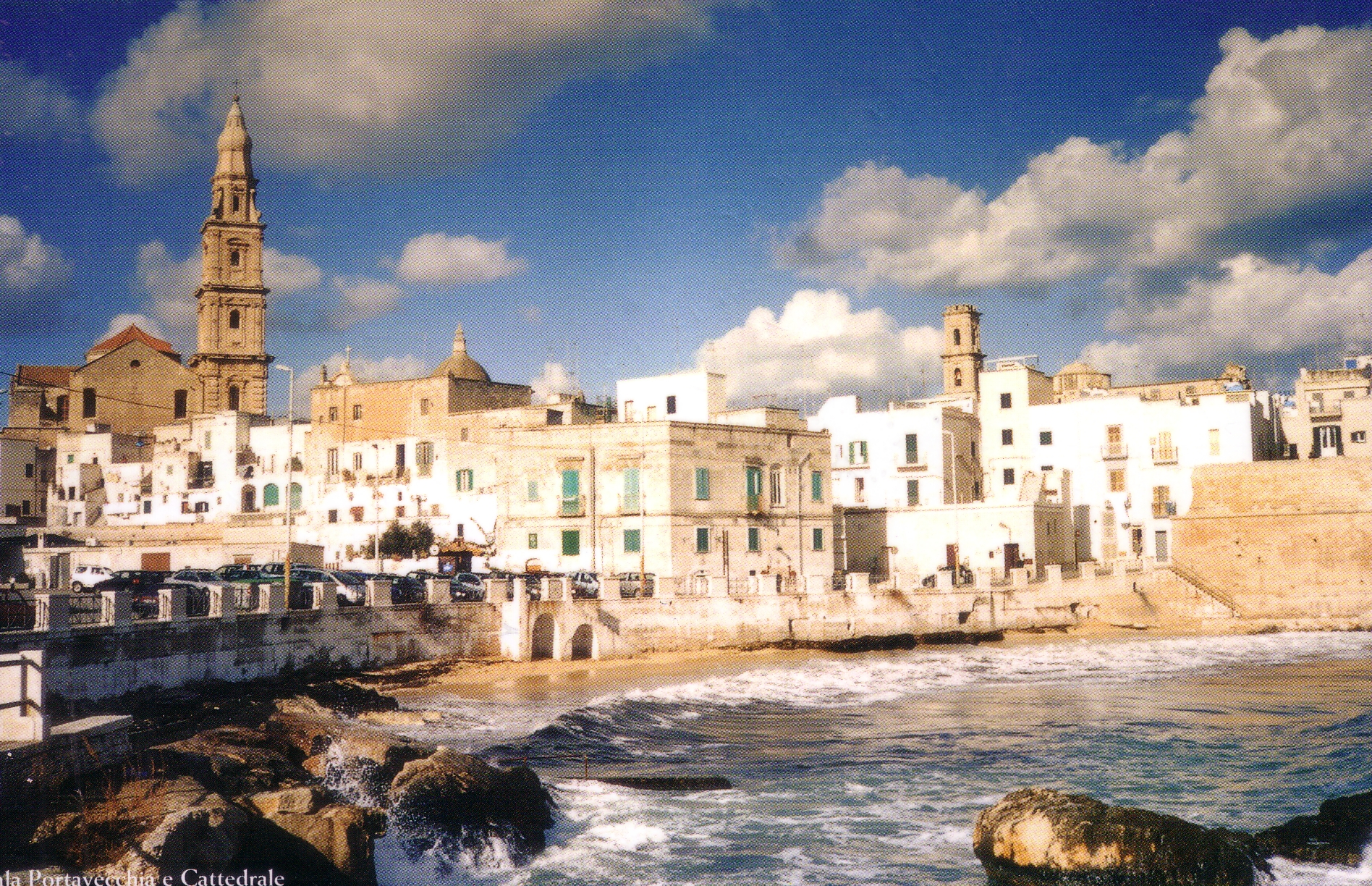
- View of Monopoli from the city beach of Cala Porta Vecchia

- Coat of arms

- Monopoli within the Province of Bari

- Location within Italy Location within Apulia
- Coordinates: 40°57′N 17°18′E
- Country: Italy
- Region: Apulia
- Metropolitan city: Bari (BA)
- Frazioni: See list

Government
  - Mayor: Angelo Annese (Forza Italia)

Area
  - Total: 157.89 km^{2} (60.96 sq mi)
- Elevation: 9 m (30 ft)

Population (31-12-2014)
  - Total: 49,246
  - Density: 311.90/km^{2} (807.82/sq mi)
- Demonym: Monopolitani
- Time zone: UTC+1 (CET)
  - Summer (DST): UTC+2 (CEST)
- Postal code: 70043
- Dialing code: 080
- Patron saint: Madonna della Madia
- Saint day: December 16
- Website: Official website

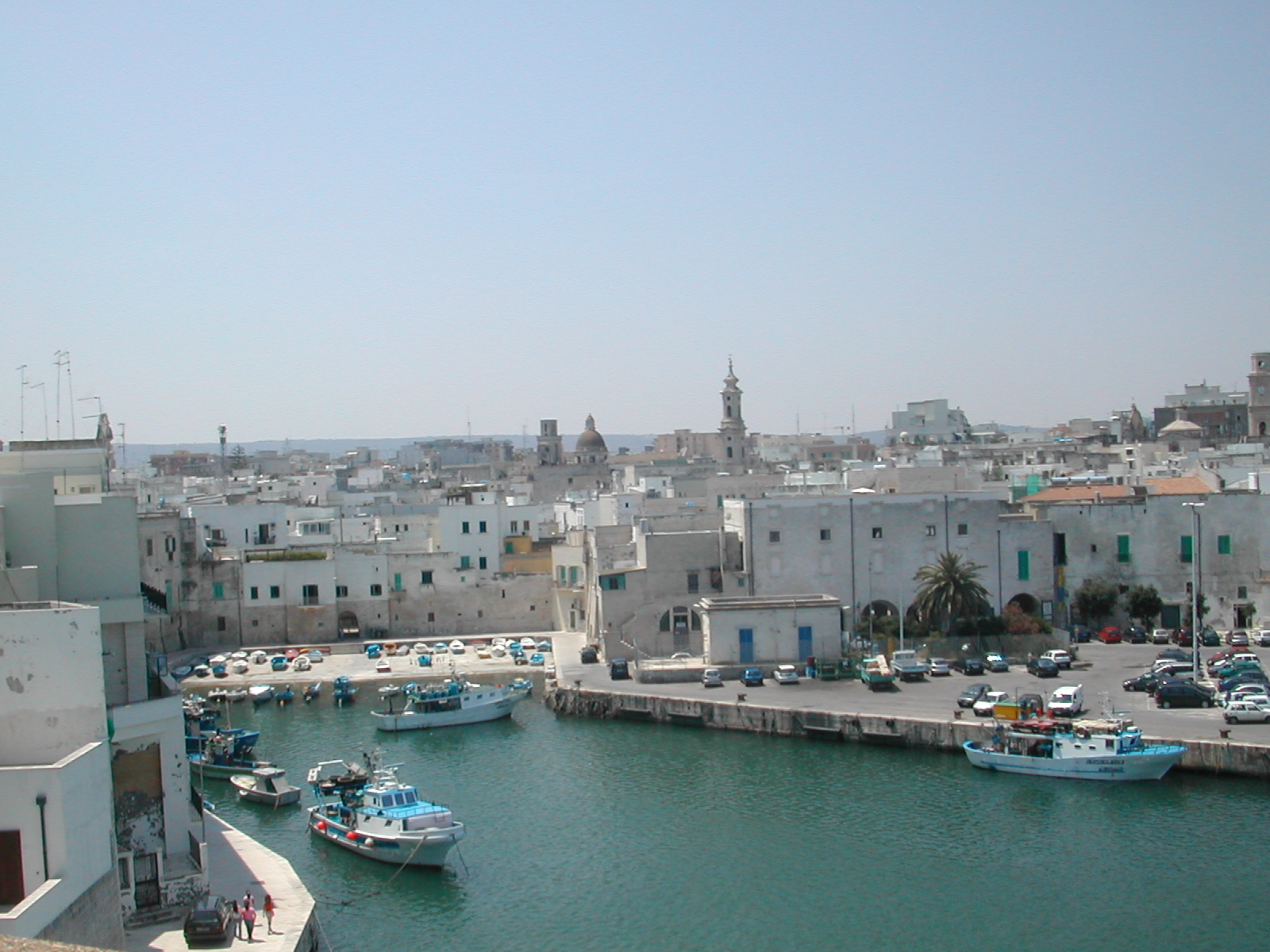
Old port

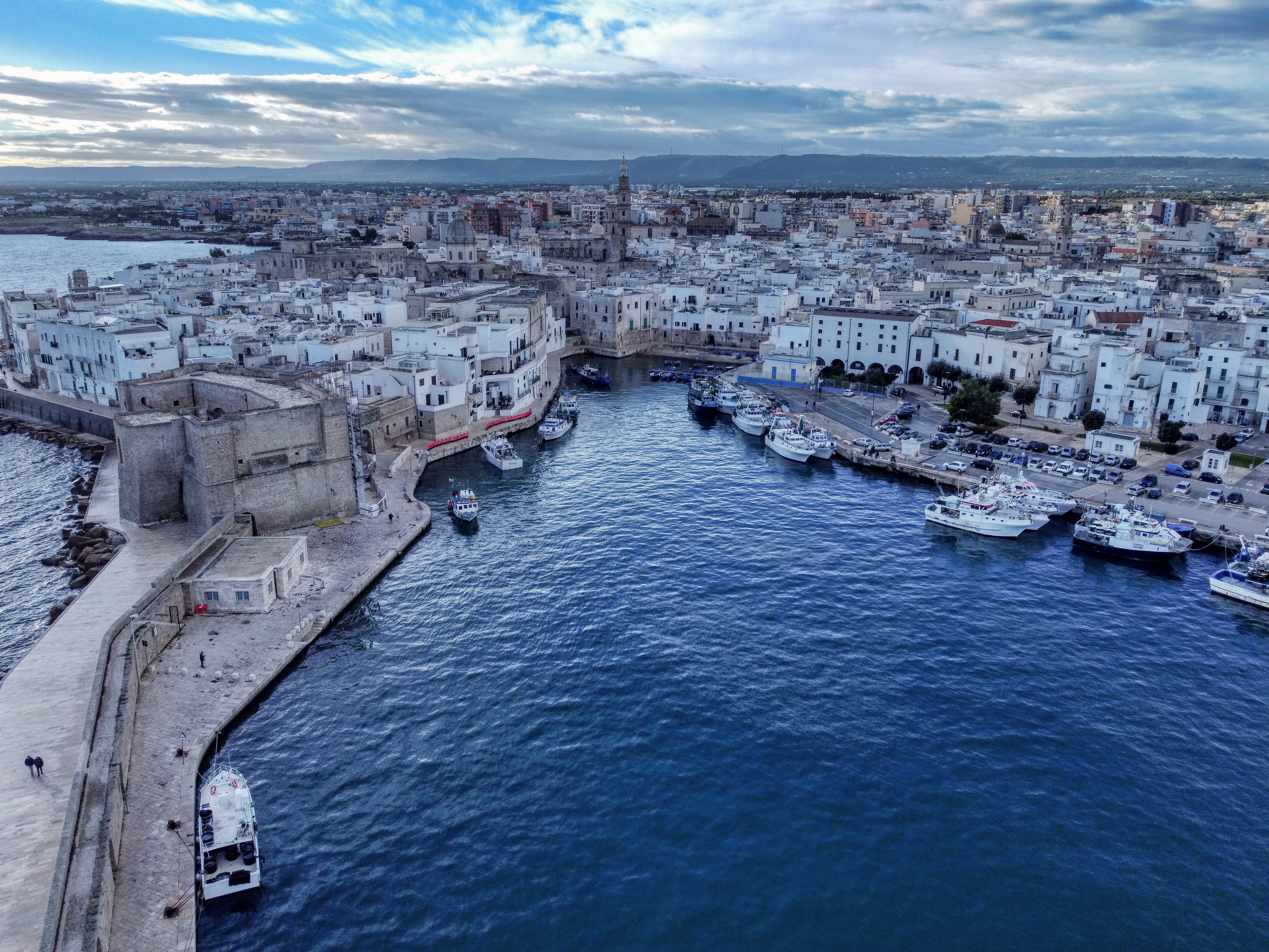
Old port

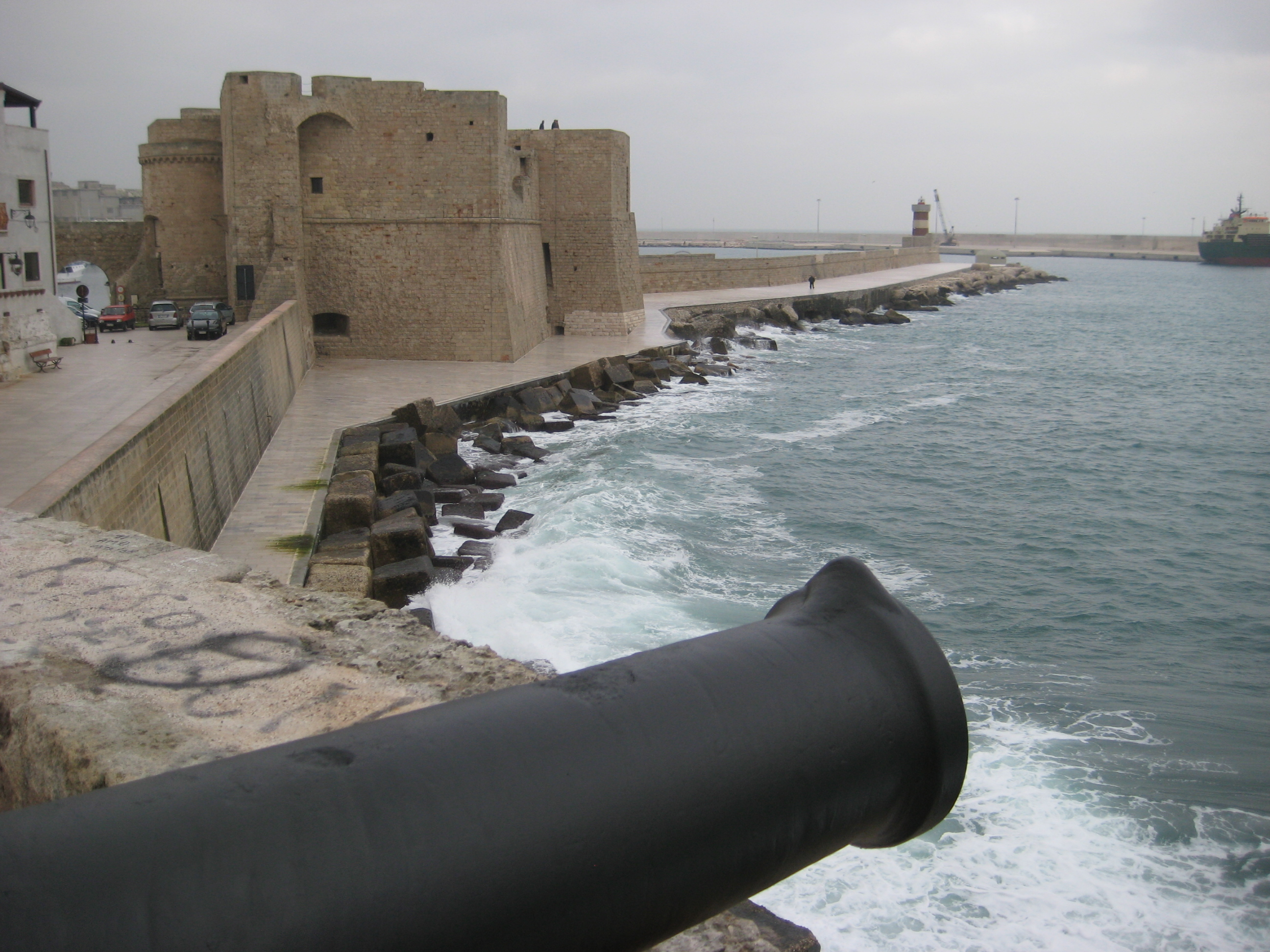
The Charles V castle behind the cannons of the bastion S.Maria

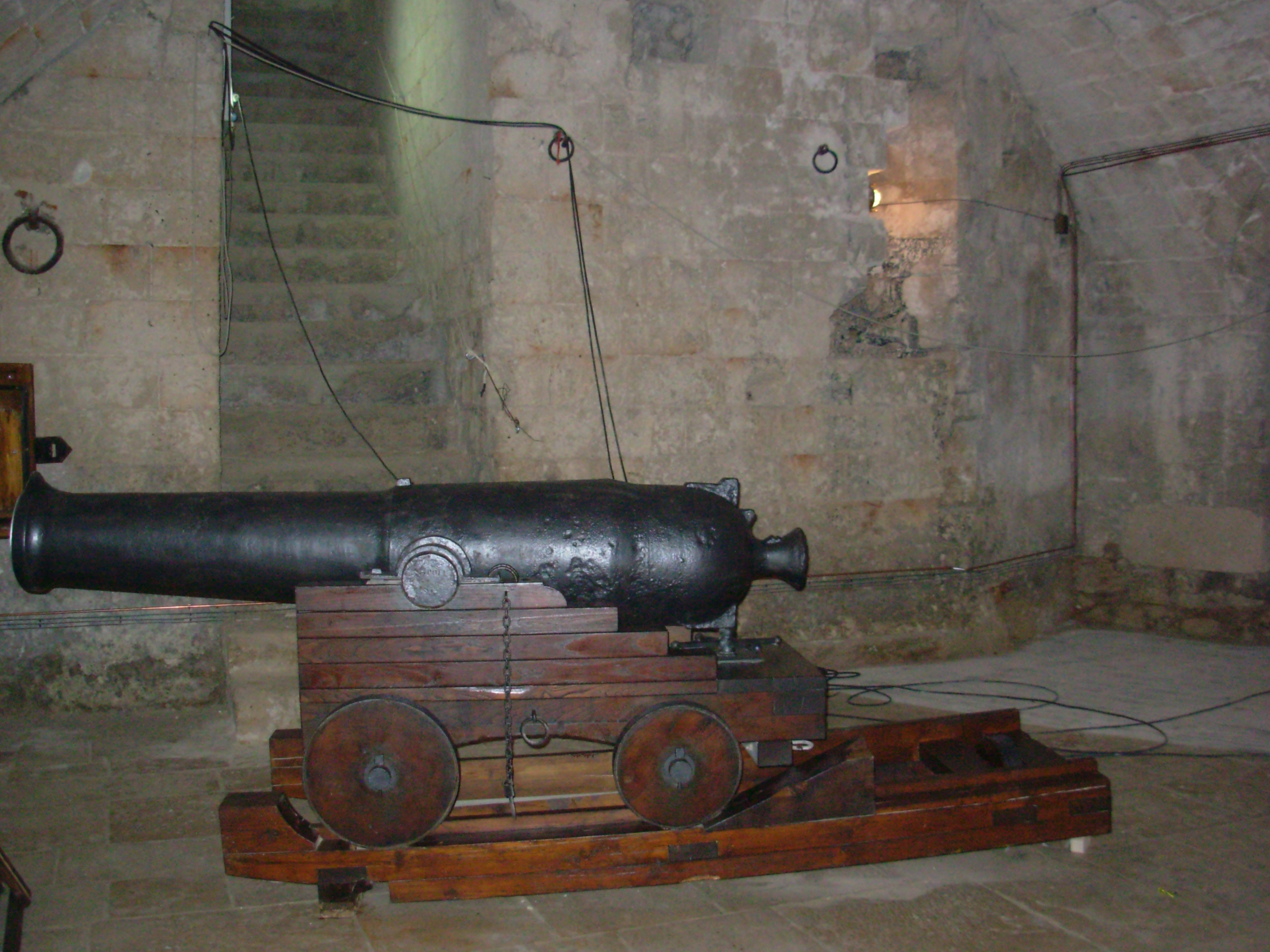
Cannons of The Charles V castle

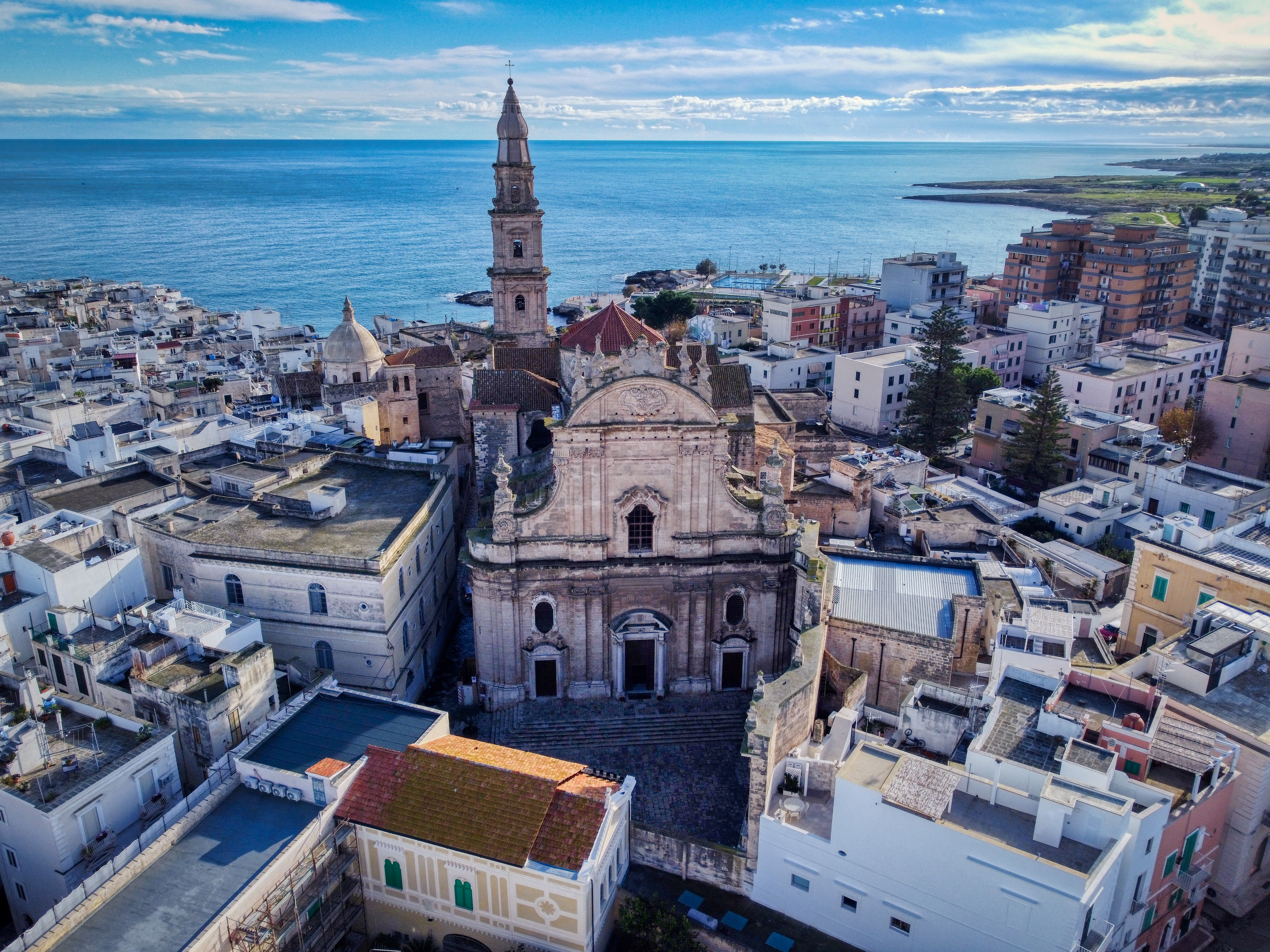
Monopoli Cathedral, the Basilica of the Madonna della Madia

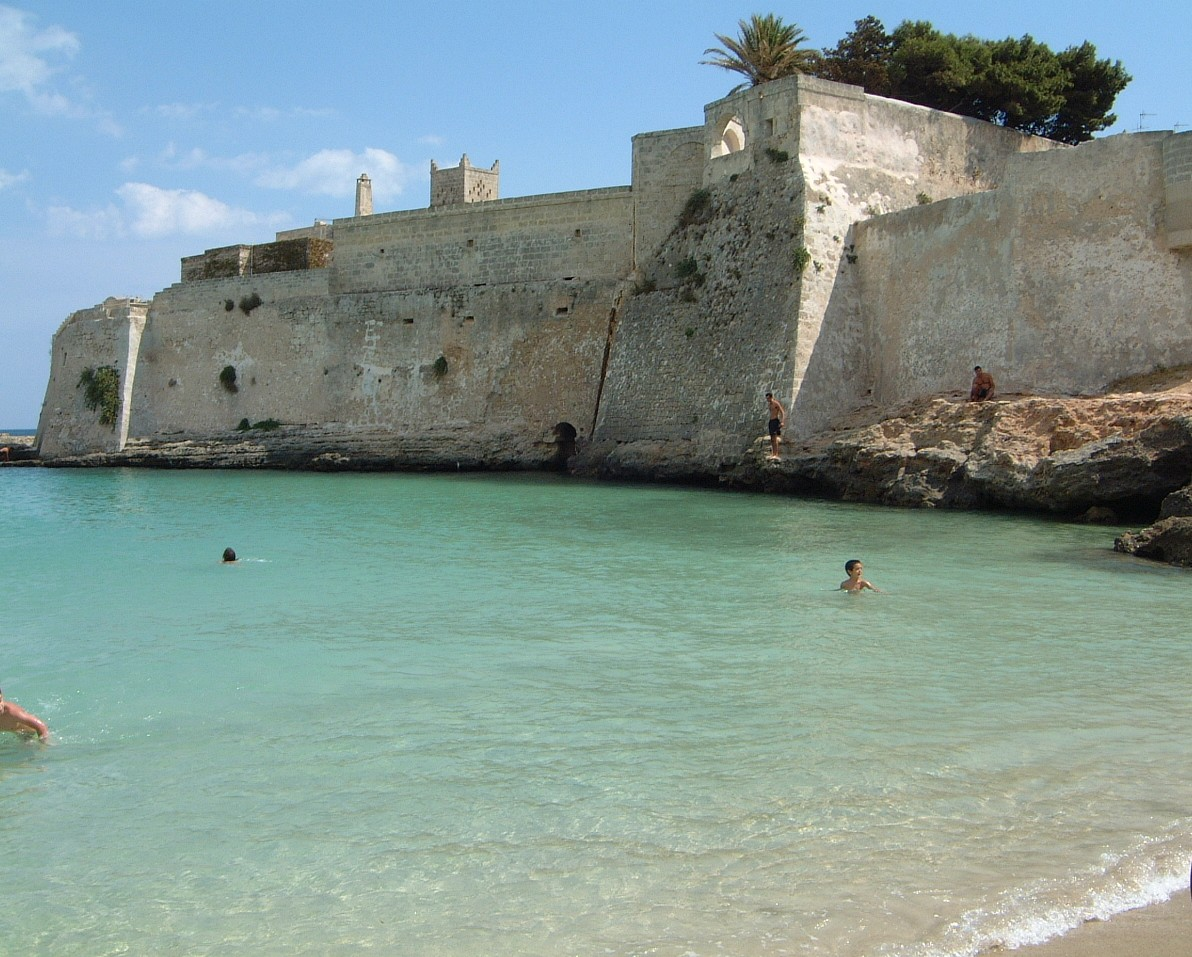
Castle/Abbey of St. Stephen

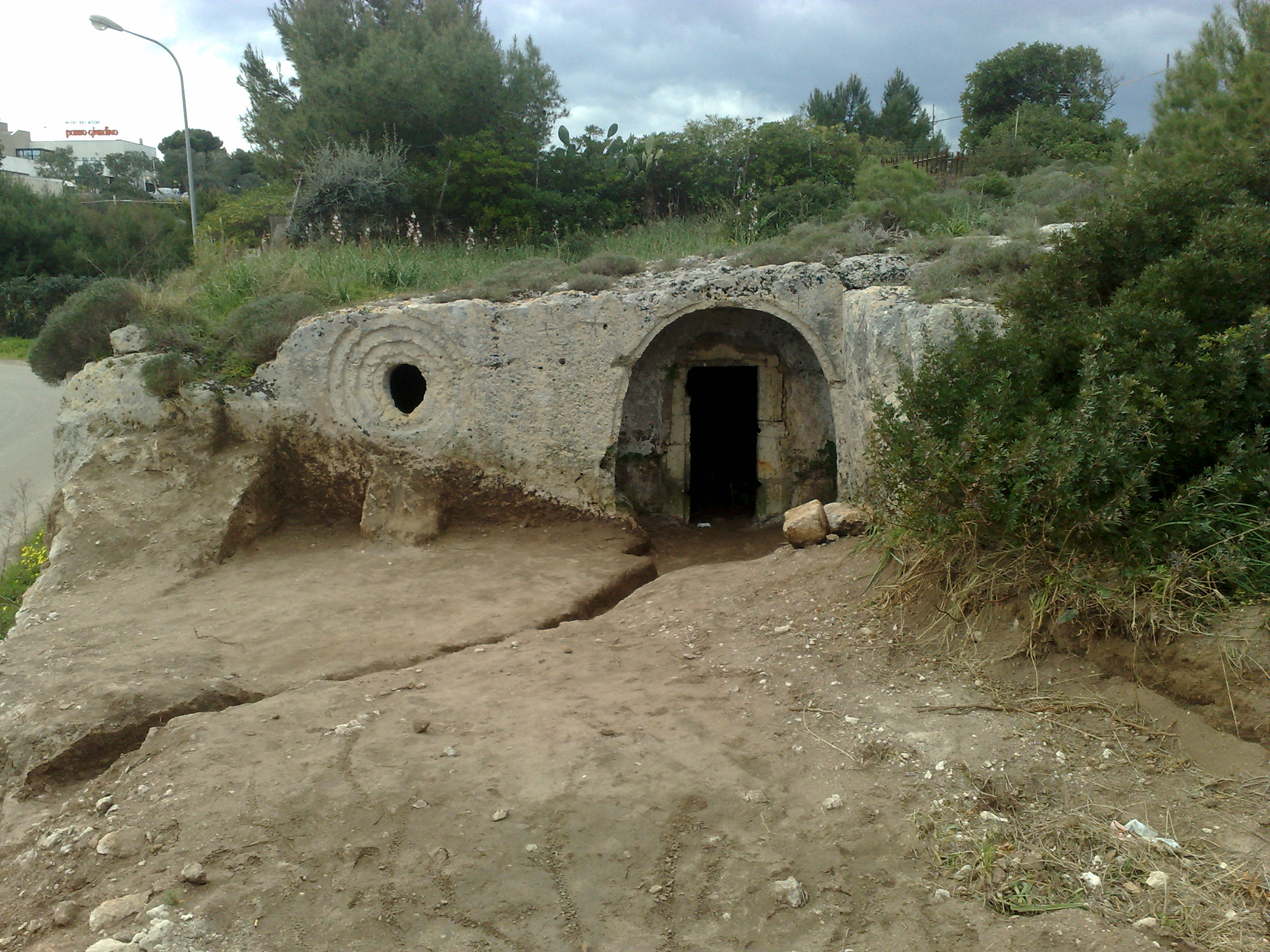
Rock church of St. George

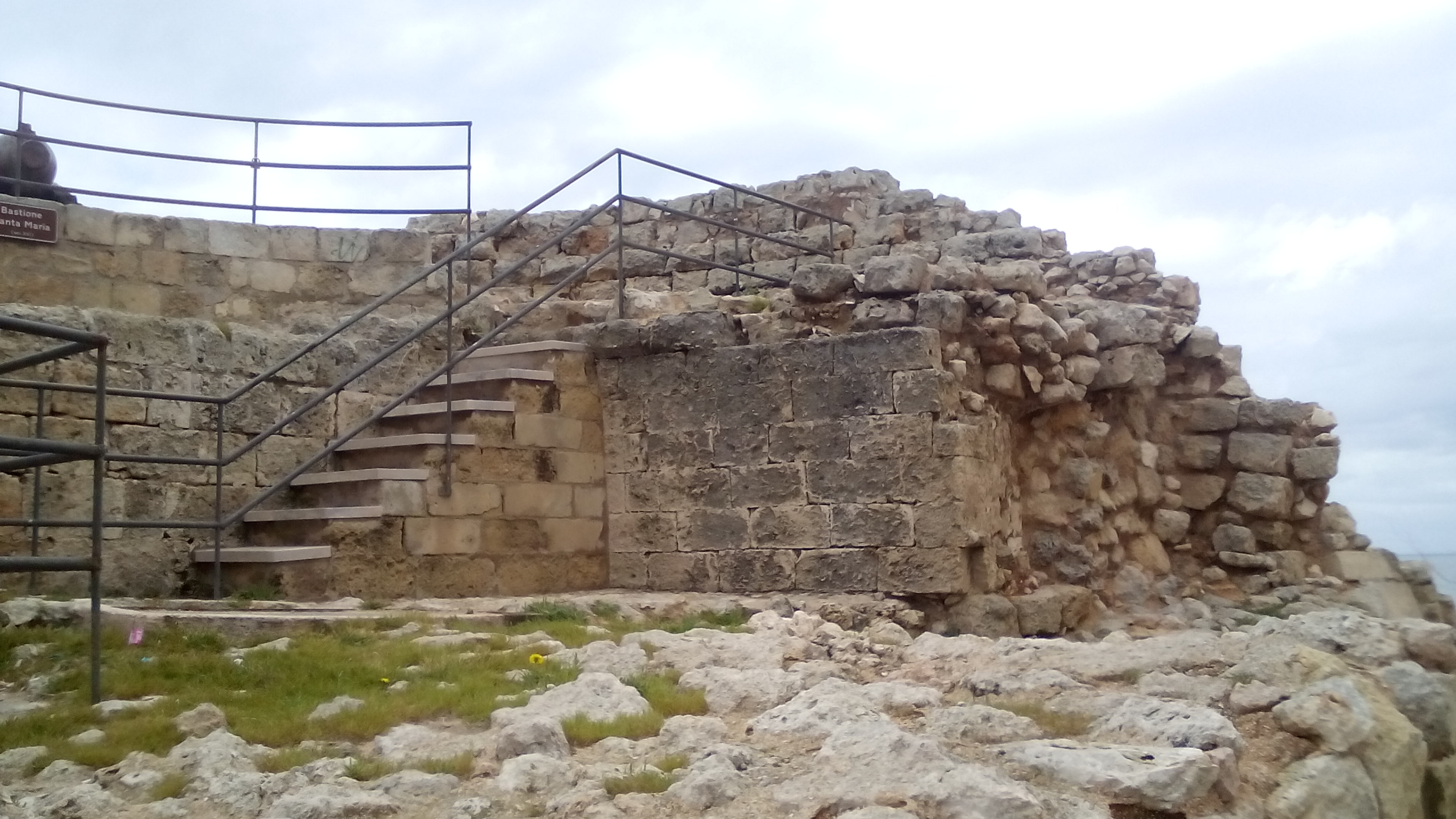
Bastione Santa Maria

Monopoli (Italian: [moˈnɔːpoli]; Monopolitan: Menòpele [məˈnɔːpələ]) is a town and municipality in Italy, in the Metropolitan City of Bari and region of Apulia. The town is roughly 156 square kilometres (60 sq mi) in area and lies on the Adriatic Sea about 40 kilometres (25 miles) southeast of Bari. It has a population of 49,246 (2014), and is important mostly as an agricultural, industrial and tourist centre.

== History ==
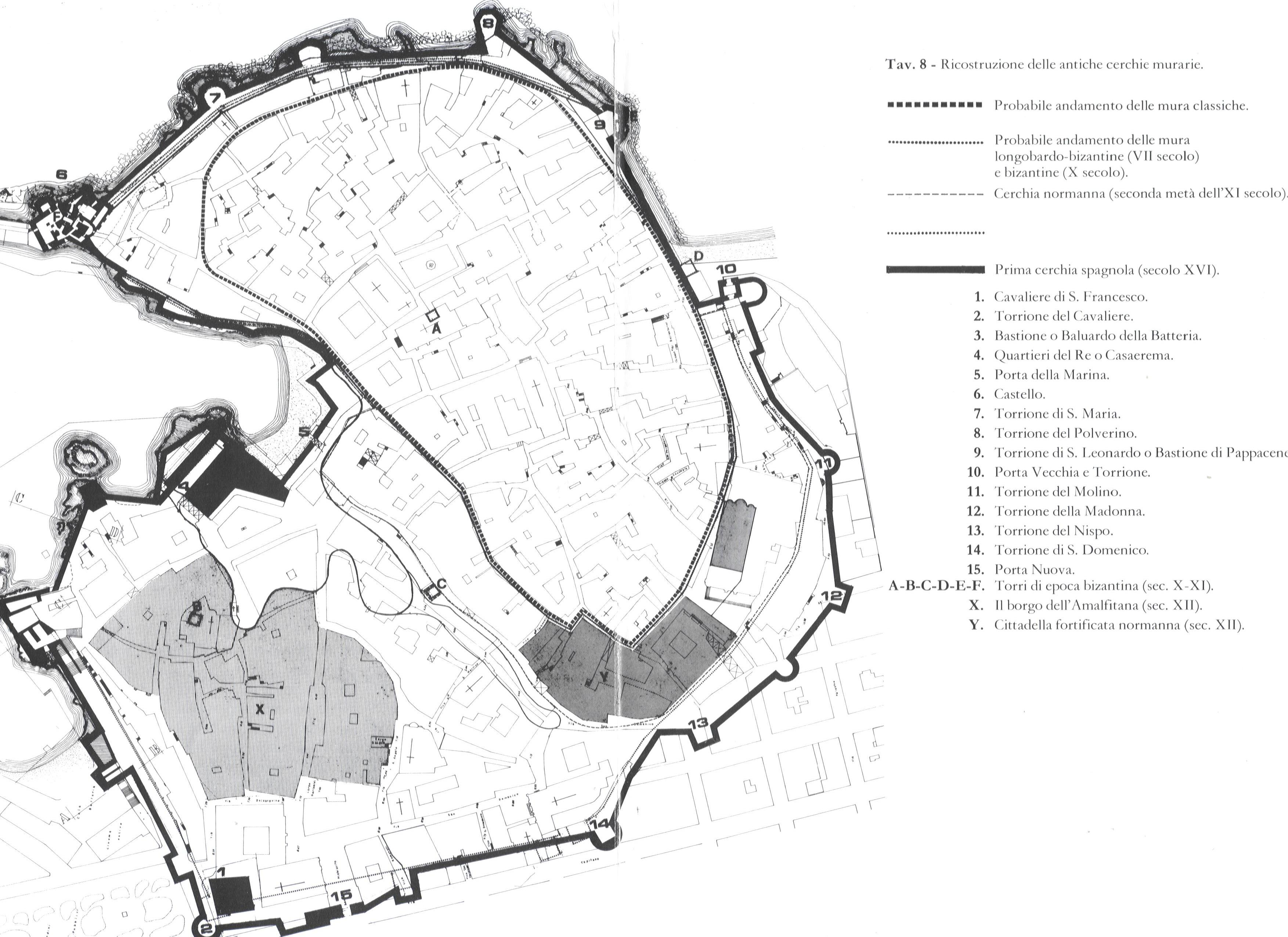
Map of the fortifications of Monopoli in the 16th century

Southern Italy was ice-free at least along the coast in the Last Glacial Maximum, and acted as a refugium for Late Paleolithic humans. The area of Monopoli was inhabited since the Early Epigravettian – roughly 15,000 years ago – at least. One infant buried at Grotta delle Mura rockshelter in the outskirts of the modern town was found to belong to a Late Western hunter-gatherer population of the Villabruna cluster, and possibly represented a smallish and close-knit refugee population originating in then-icebound Northern Italy or even Central Europe.

The area's first documented permanent settlement, in about 500 BC, was a fortified Messapian city.

In order to improve communication with the East, between the years 108 and 110 AD, the Emperor Trajan ordered the construction of a Via Publica which was named after him. Monopoli is the city in Apulia that has the longest stretch of the Via Traiana. This is one of the most important Roman roads of the Empire. In 2012 the city of Monopoli created an archeological park around the remains of this ancient road. The difference between this new road and the Appian Way was the shorter distance between Benevento and Brindisi. The Appian Way started in Rome, reaching Benevento and continuing on to Taranto, and from there the road continued to Brindisi, from which port people could take ship for Greece, the Orient and the Balkans. The Via Traiana, which followed an older route, began in Benevento and crossing the flat tableland up to Canosa continued on to Ruvo, where a fork in the road led in two different directions. The inland road went to Modugno, Ceglie del Campo, Capurso, Rutigliano and Conversano, while the coastal road went to Bari, Polignano, and Monopoli. These two roads joined again at Egnazia, from where the road continued to Brindisi. This road which Emperor Trajan had constructed became the route of choice to reach Brindisi because it was shorter than the Appian Way. It was travelled by military troops, merchants, slaves, pilgrims and, after the fall of Rome, even by hordes of barbarians. There is another important road on the other side of the Adriatic Sea which seems to be the continuation of this road. It is called the Via Egnatia (Egnazia Way) and starts in Dyrrachium (Durazzo), in Albania, crossing a mountainous area to reach Thessaloniki (Salonica) and continuing on to Constantinople (Istanbul).

After the destruction of Gnatia by the Ostrogoth king Totila in 545, its inhabitants fled to Monopoli, from whence it derives its name as "only city". In the following centuries the area would be controlled by the Byzantines, Normans and Hohenstaufen. At the height of its splendour, the city was a point of departure for naval expeditions during the Crusades. Later it was a fief under Angevine and Aragonese feudal lords.

In 1484 the city came under Venetian control and saw an economic upswing as a seaport on the Adriatic Sea, a base between Bari and Brindisi as well as through trading its own agricultural goods. It was frequently attacked by Muslim pirates in the following decades. These continuous threats forced Monopoli to build strong fortifications which allowed them in 1529 to resist the Armada of Charles V for three months, forcing the Spaniards to abandon the siege. In 1529 the city, protected by its highly effective defensive system, with the help of Venetian soldiers and its citizens, successfully resisted a three-month siege by the Spanish empire under the command of the Marquis of Vasto Alfonso III d 'Avalos, who was forced to withdraw, due to losses. After the peace with Venice, the city passes peacefully into the hands of the Spanish and Charles V. However, although Monopoli pass back under Spanish rule, it still was granted a free city status.

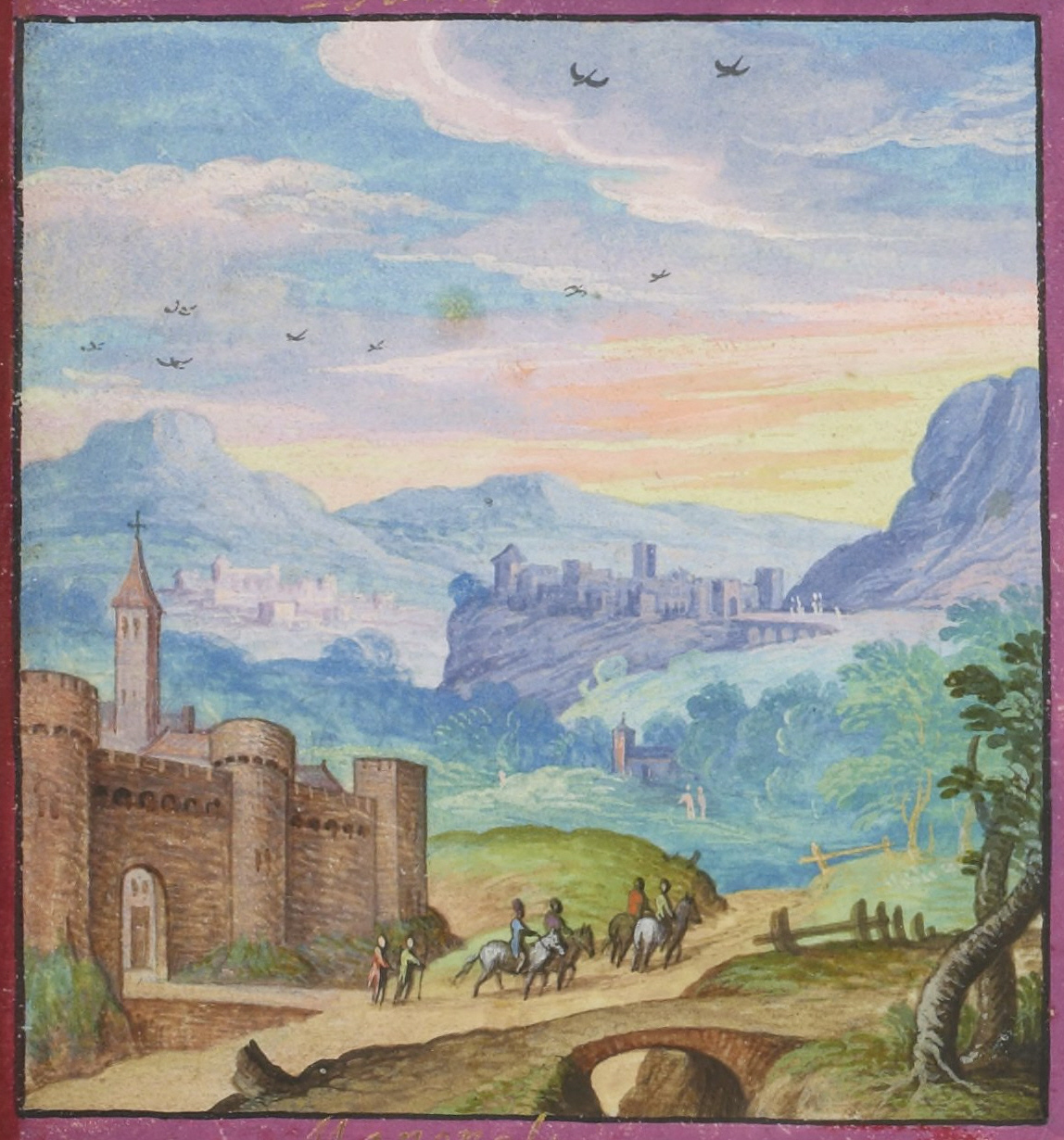
Monopoli, about 1578, from the Maggi Codex

Monopoli became part of the newly unified Kingdom of Italy in 1860.

The city, lying in the south of Italy or Mezzogiorno, enjoyed a certain economic development during the 1960s thanks to the opening of an industrial plant by Tognana, an important Italian ceramic manufacturer. The closure of the plant at the end of the 1990s was a major blow to the city's economy. Monopoli's economic recovery in the 21st century has been due mainly to new industries, the most important being MerMec, a manufacturer of railway material, along with the development of tourism, especially in the countryside and on the coast.

The Monopolele Ukulele Festival was born in Monopoli in 2022 with a mission to promote the ukulele as a tool for connection and cultural exchange, creating an event that celebrates music, Mediterranean tradition, and the value of community. Organized by the Associazione Voltare Pagina, the festival has attracted artists and enthusiasts from around the world since its inception, quickly transforming Monopoli into one of Europe's ukulele capitals.

== Geography ==
=== Overview ===
Located in the south-eastern corner of its province, near the borders with the one of Brindisi, and by the Adriatic Coast, Monopoli borders with the municipalities of Alberobello, Castellana Grotte, Fasano (BR) and Polignano a Mare. The town is 15 km from Fasano, 33 from Martina Franca, 44 from Bari, 64 from Taranto and 75 from Brindisi.

=== Frazioni ===
The territory outside the walled city counts 91 hamlets (frazioni) and localities named contrade. Some of them, which merged with the urbanized area of the town, were suppressed and became outer wards. The others are mostly rural localities, mainly composed by some scattered farmhouses.

The 91 contrade are: Antonelli, Aratico, Arenazza, Assunta, Baione, Balice, Barcato, Bellocchio, Belvedere, Cacaveccia, Cardillo, Caramanna, Carluccio, Carrassa, Casale, Cavallerizza, Cervarulo, Chianchizza, Chiesa dei Morti, Ciminiera, Ciporelli, Conchia, Corvino, Cozzana, Cristo Cozzana, Cristo delle Zolle, Cristo Re, Due Torri, Gorgofreddo, Gravina, Grotta dell'Acqua, Guadiano, Guidano, Impalata, Laghezza, Lama di Macina, Lamalunga, Lamammolilla, Lamandia, Lamarossa, Lamascrasciola, Losciale, Macchia di Casa, Macchia di Monte, Marzone, Monte Scopa, Moredifame, Mozzo, Nispole, Padresergio, Pagliericci, Pantano (inurbata), Parco di Tuccio, Paretano, Passarello, Passionisti (inurbata), Peroscia, Petrarolo, Piangevino, Pilone, Romanelli, Samato, Sant' Andrea, Sant' Antonio d'Ascula, San Bartolomeo, San Francesco da Paola, San Gerardo, San Luca, San Lucia, San Nicola, Sant' Oceano, Sant' Oronzo, Santo Stefano, Santa Teresa, San Vincenzo, Scarciglia, Sicarico, Sorba, Spina, Stomazzelli, Tavarello, Terranova, Tormento, Torchiano, Torre d'Orta, Torricella, Tortorella, Vagone, Virbo, Zecca and Zingarello.

== Main sights ==
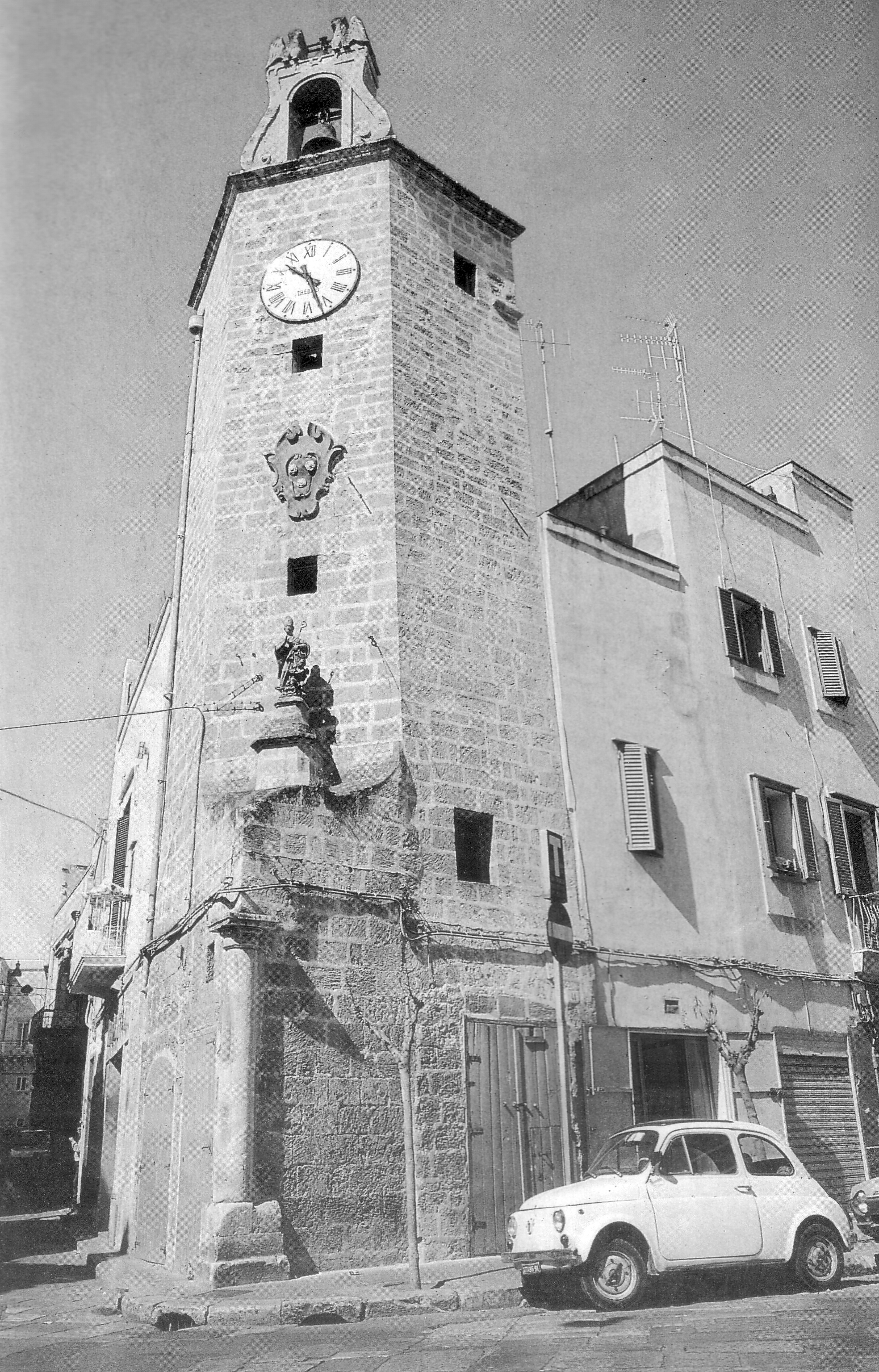
The clock tower

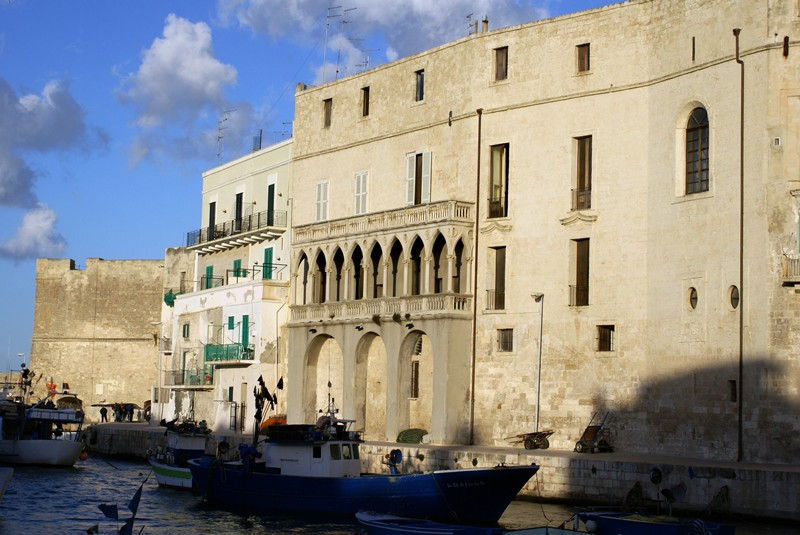
A palazzo

- Castle of Charles V. Finished in 1525, it has a pentagonal plan. It is located on a promontory which was originally separated from the medieval city. It was restored and enlarged in the 17th century. Starting from the early 19th century, it was used as a jail, a status it kept until 1969. It is currently the seat of an art exhibition and cultural events.
- Coastal castle of St. Stephen, built by the Norman lord Godfrey of Conversano in 1086. It was subsequently turned into a Benedictine monastery.
- The Jerusalem Hospital, founded in 1350 by the Knights Hospitallers.
- Monopoli Cathedral (18th century), minor basilica
- Palazzo Palmieri (18th century)
- Monte San Nicola (Mount St. Nicholas) faunal reserve. The reserve, lying on the summit of a hill, 290 metres (950 ft) high in the Murge plateau, is important for the presence of some endemic plants.

== Sport ==
The local football club is the S.S. Monopoli 1966. Its home ground is the Stadio Vito Simone Veneziani.

== Notable people ==
- Giorgio Lapazaya (c. 1495 – c. 1570), mathematician and musician
- Giacomo Insanguine (1728–95), composer

Sportsmen and sportswomen

- Giandomenico Mesto (1982), footballer; bronze medal Olympic games 2004, gold medal European Under-21 2004
- Gianpiero Sportelli (1987), martial artist; k-1 world champion 2010 and European champion k-1 2013. Chessboxing world championship, bronze medal 2017, 2024 and silver medal 2019
- Vito Sardella (1974), distance runner "World Athletics".
- Marialucia Palmitessa (1998) clay pigeon shooting, world champion Juniores Trap.

== Twin towns – sister cities ==
Monopoli is twinned with:

- Lyss, Switzerland
- Lugoj, Romania
- Vlorë, Albania

== Transport ==
Monopoli is served by Monopoli railway station. Monopoli is served by the following nearby airports:

- Bari Airport
- Brindisi Airport

Monopoli is also served by Cotrap and FS Sud Est buses.

== See also ==
- Monopoli railway station

== Bibliography ==
- Francesco Antonio Glianes, Monopoli nel Medioevo e nel Rinascimento, Schena Editore.
- L. Finamore Pepe, Monopoli e la Monarchia delle Puglie, Monopoli, 1897.
- Sebastiano Lillo, Monopoli sintesi storico geografica, Grafiche Colucci Monopoli, 1976.
- Stefano Carbonara, Monopoli nel Secondo Novecento, Schena Editore.
- Domenico Cofano, Monopoli nell'età del Rinascimento, Biblioteca Comunale Prospero Rendella.
- Giuseppe Andreassi, Mare d'Egnazia, Schena Editore.
- Domenico Capitanio, Il sistema difensivo e la città, Monopoli nel suo passato vol.5, Comune di Monopoli, Grafischena s.r.l., Fasano. 1992.
