= Episcopal Diocese of the Armed Services and Federal Ministries =

Diocese of the Episcopal Church in the United States

Office of the Bishop Suffragan for of Armed Forces and Federal Ministries

Location
- Country: United States
- Denomination: Episcopal Church

Current leadership
- Bishop: The Rt. Rev. Ann Ritonia

Website
- https://www.episcopalchurch.org/who-we-are/ministries/armed-forces-and-federal-ministries/

The Office of the Bishop Suffragan for Armed Forces and Federal Ministries is responsible for Episcopal chaplains working in the Department of War, the Department of Veterans Affairs and the Federal Bureau of Prisons.

In accordance with the Constitution and Canons of The Episcopal Church, “It shall be lawful for the House of Bishops to elect a Bishop Suffragan who, under the direction of the Presiding Bishop, shall be in charge of the work of those chaplains in the Armed Forces of the United States, Veterans’ Administration Medical Centers, and Federal Correctional Institutions who are ordained Ministers of this Church." (Art. II, Sec. 7).

== Bishops ==
- Arnold Lewis (1964−1971)
- Clarence E. Hobgood (1971−1978)
- Charles L. Burgreen (1978−1989)
- Charles L. Keyser (1990−2000)
- George Elden Packard (2000−2010)
- James B. "Jay" Magness (2010−2017)
- Carl W. Wright (2017−2022)
- Ann Ritonia (2023-Present)

== See also ==
- United States Army Chaplain Corps
- United States Air Force Chaplain Corps
- United States Navy Chaplain Corps
- Episcopal Church Service Cross
