= Ann Ritonia =

American bishop

The Right Reverend Ann Ritonia
- Suffragan Bishop for Federal Ministries
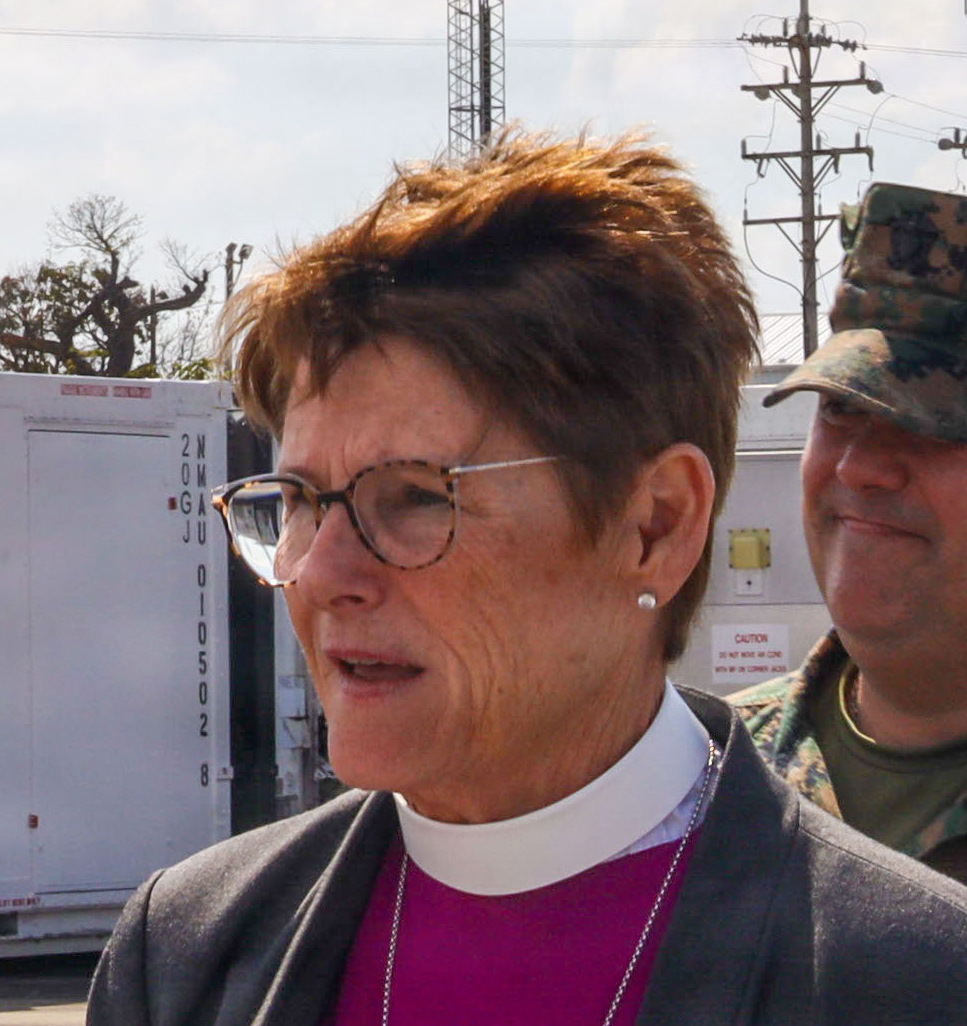
- Ritonia visits U.S. Marines in 2026
- Church: Episcopal Church
- See: Episcopal Diocese of the Armed Services and Federal Ministries
- In office: September 2023 to present

Orders
- Consecration: September 30, 2023

Personal details
- Denomination: Anglicanism
- Spouse: Michael Ritonia
- Profession: Military chaplain

The Rt. Rev. Ann Ritonia is an American bishop currently serving as bishop suffragan for Armed Services and Federal Ministries. She was consecrated on September 30, 2023.

== Early life and education ==
Ritonia grew up in a Roman Catholic family that was deeply involved in their local church in Norwood, Massachusetts.

She studied music at the New England Conservatory of Music and played the euphonium, and later continued her education at the Armed Forces School of Music.

== Career ==
=== Marines ===
In 1980, Ritonia joined the United States Marine Corps, entering the first Officer Candidates School class that included both men and women.

She served in the Marine Corps and later in the Marine Corps Reserve for 17 years, including as administrative officer at Parris Island, South Carolina. She also commanded an engineering unit in Green Bay, Wisconsin, and retired in the rank of major. She was awarded the Navy Commendation Medal, the Navy Achievement Medal and the National Defense Service Medal.

=== Episcopal Church ===
While serving as a lay music minister at a Roman Catholic church, Ritonia was offered a similar position at an Episcopal church and began contemplating ordination. She studied at Wesley Theological Seminary in Washington and spent a year at the Anglican Virginia Theological Seminary.

Following her ordination, Ritonia served in parishes in Virginia and Connecticut. In 2017, after serving as Rector of St. Peter’s Episcopal Church in Poolesville, Maryland, she was appointed rector of St. John's Church in Ellicott City, Maryland. She has also been a chaplain for the Marine Corps League and for the Veterans Affairs healthcare system.

On 12 March 2023, she was elected to succeed the Rt. Rev. Carl Wright as bishop suffragan for Armed Services and Federal Ministries. She was consecrated in September 2023 at St. John's Episcopal Church, Lafayette Square, in Washington, D.C.

== Family ==
With her husband, Michael, a former operations executive for AOL, Ritonia has four children.
