= Giorgio Lapazaya =

Italian mathematician

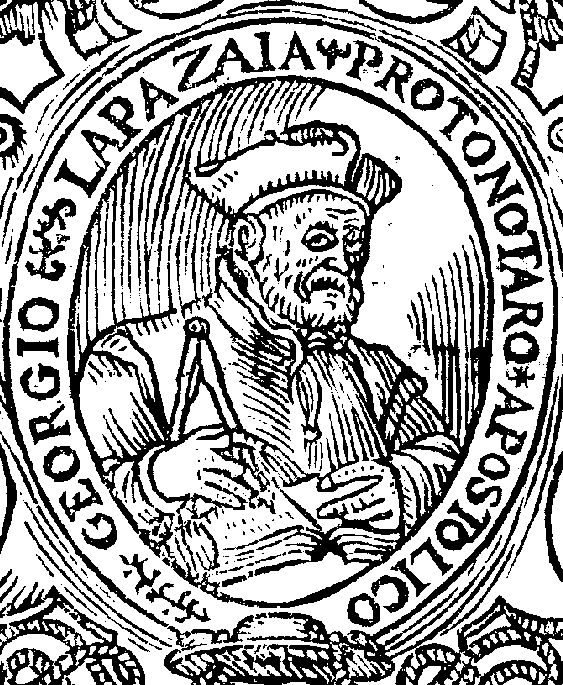
Depiction of Giorgio Lapazaya in an illustration found in his work (1575)

Giorgio Lapazaya (c.1495 in Monopoli – 1564) was an Italian mathematician and musician of Albanian descent.

== Biography ==
He was the son of Danush and Maruccia whom arrived in Monopoli from Durrës after the fall of Constantinople to the Turks (1453). He achieved the title of sub-diaconate in 1508, and was a Canonical of the Cathedral of Monopoli from 1533. In the following years he was given the office of Prothonotary apostolic by Pope Pius IV. He was trained culturally in the quadrivium, and in 1532 has compiled an Antiphonary (of processional type) where, in addition to well-known songs from the Gregorian repertoire, he put some his short compositions monophonic closely linked to the cult practiced in the Renaissance in Monopoli. This was discovered in the late 1970s and published by eminent musicologist Domenico Morgante in various studies since 1981. This precious parchment is the oldest Italo-Albanian music source and testifies to the existence of a profitable cultural "contamination" between the two sides of the Adriatic Sea.

In 1542 he edited, at the publisher Sultzbach in Naples, an important treatise on Arithmetic and Geometry which was reprinted almost without interruption until the late Eighteenth century (1566, 1569, 1575, 1590, 1601, 1723, 1727, 1784). The presence of his family, owner of jus patronatus in the ancient Church of St. Peter, is documented in Monopoli at least until the first half of the Eighteenth century. His original surname in Albanian (Lapazaya) appears, both in handwritten documents in the archive, both in printed works, in a rich variety of forms: Lapizzaya, Lapizzaglia, Lapizzaga, Lapezzaja, etc.

The City of Monopoli has dedicated him a street not far from the cathedral, and his marble bust stands in the entrance to the Council Chamber of the City of Durrës.
