= Carl Wright (bishop) =

American clergyman

The Right Reverend Carl Wright
- Bishop Suffragan for Armed Services and Federal Ministries
- Church: The Episcopal Church
- In office: 2017–2022
- Predecessor: James Magness
- Successor: Ann Ritonia

Orders
- Consecration: February 11, 2017 by Michael Curry

The Rt. Rev. Carl Wright is an American clergyman who served as bishop for Armed Services and Federal Ministries in the Episcopal Church in the United States.

== Career ==
=== Air Force ===
Wright enlisted in the United States Air Force in 1978. He was later commissioned as an officer in the Maryland Army National Guard and the United States Army Reserve. He retired in the rank of lieutenant colonel in 2011.

=== Episcopal Church ===
In 1993, Wright became a chaplain in the Air Force. On September 20, 2016, while serving as Rector of St. Andrew's Episcopal Church in Pasadena, Maryland, he was elected to serve as Bishop Suffragan for Armed Services and Federal Ministries. His election came at a meeting of the House of Bishops, rather than from a diocesan convention, in accordance with the canons of the church. He was consecrated on February 11, 2017, at the Washington National Cathedral.

He resigned in 2022 on health grounds, and successfully underwent brain surgery in 2023.

He is an associate member of the Order of the Holy Cross.

Episcopal Church (USA) titles
Preceded by Jay Magness	Bishop of the Episcopal Diocese of the Armed Services and Federal Ministries; 2017 − 2022	Succeeded by Ann Ritonia
