= Episcopal Church Service Cross =

Cross worn by Episcopalian soldiers in the US army

The Episcopal Church Service Cross (formerly called the Episcopal Church War Cross) is a pendant cross worn as a "distinct mark" of an Episcopalian in the United States Armed Forces. The Episcopal Church suggests that Episcopalian service members wear it on their dog tags or otherwise carry it with them at all times.

== History ==
In 1917, the Episcopal Church created a War Commission to help serve the religious needs of Episcopalians in the U.S. military during World War I. Under the chairmanship of William Lawrence, Bishop of Massachusetts, the Commission supplied Episcopal chaplains with portable altars, vestments, prayer books, bibles, hymnals, and money for special assistance.

The Commission decided that something more personal than service books should be given to Episcopalian troops as a reminder of their religious faith. The Commission requested that Edith Weir Perry, wife of the Bishop of Rhode Island, James DeWolf Perry, obtain designs for a cross or scapular. Mrs. Perry approached the architectural firm of Bertram Goodhue, which produced the design.

During World War I, the Cross was distributed by Episcopal chaplains to "thousands" of Episcopalian troops in active service overseas.

With the outbreak of World War II, the Episcopal Church reestablished the Commission. Under the chairmanship of Henry Knox Sherrill, Bishop of Massachusetts, the Commission decided to resume issuing the Cross. The Cross was given to both Episcopal chaplains and parish clergy to distribute to Episcopalian troops. By 1944, about 226,000 Crosses had been given to Episcopalian men and women serving in that war.

By 2008, the Episcopal Church published a blessing for use with the Cross.

== Appearance ==
The Cross is a five-fold cross, symbolic of the five wounds of Jesus Christ at his crucifixion. The Cross is rounded to avoid sharp points.

The inscriptions on the Cross have evolved over time.

- The Cross for World War I is inscribed on the obverse with "CHRIST DIED FOR THEE," a quotation from the communion service in the Book of Common Prayer, and on the reverse with "The Church War Cross."
- During World War II, the Roman numeral "II" was added to the reverse inscription.
- By 1951, the reverse inscription changed to "Episcopal Church Service Cross."
- Following the publication of the 1979 edition of the Book of Common Prayer, the obverse inscription changed to "CHRIST DIED FOR YOU."

== See also ==
- Anglican devotions
- Episcopal Diocese of the Armed Services and Federal Ministries
- Religious symbolism in the United States military
