= George Elden Packard =

The Right Reverend George E. Packard
- Bishop
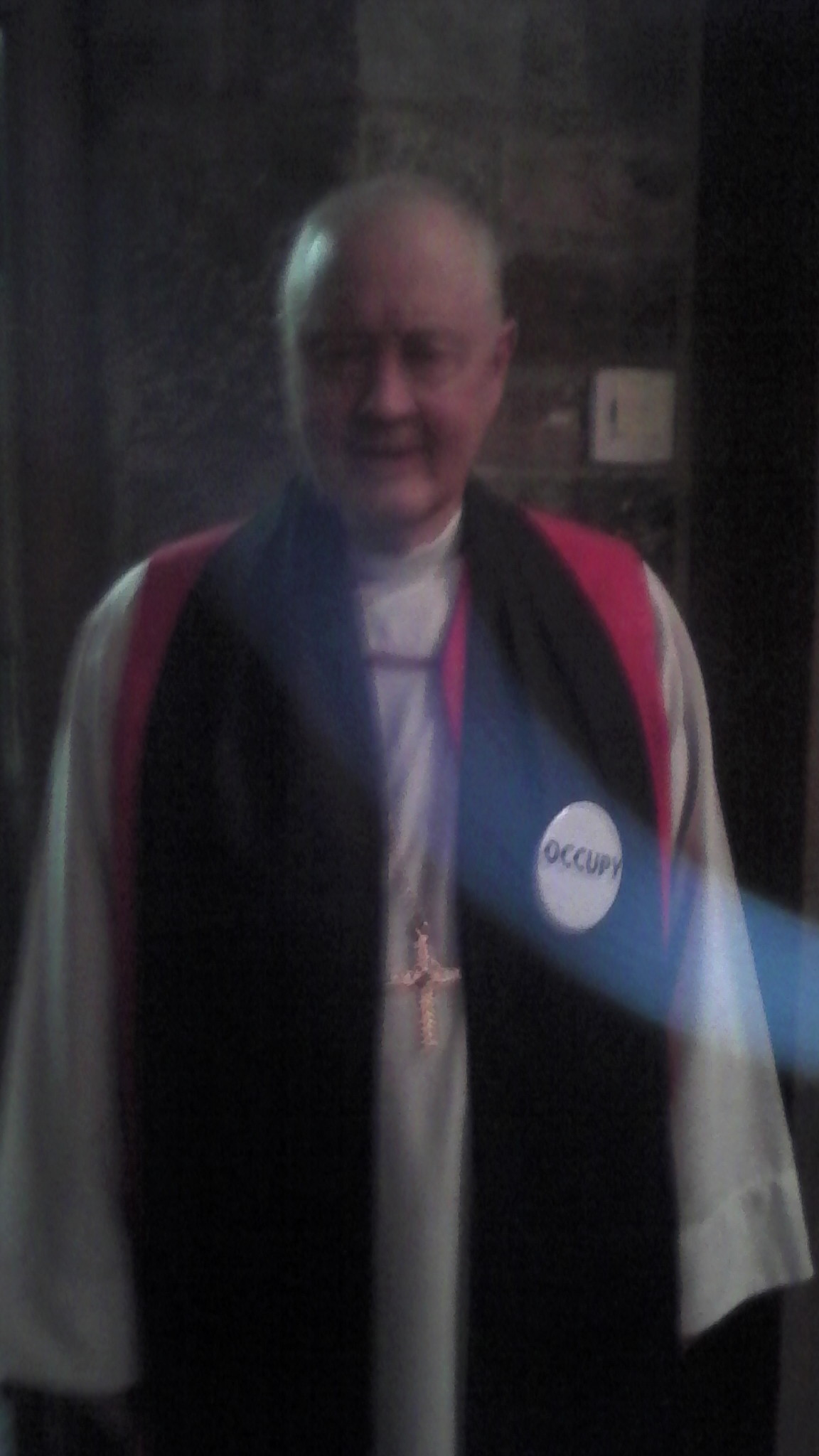
- Rt.Rev. George Packard
- Church: Episcopal Church
- See: Armed Forces, Healthcare and Prison Ministries (now Federal Ministries)
- In office: 2000 – 2010
- Predecessor: Charles Keyser
- Successor: James B. Magness

Orders
- Ordination: 1974
- Consecration: c. 2000 by Frank Griswold, Charles Keyser, Richard Grein
- Rank: suffragan

Personal details
- Born: February 23, 1944 (age 82) New Rochelle, New York

George Elden Packard (born February 23, 1944) is a retired United States Army officer and bishop of the Episcopal Church known for his support for the Occupy movement.

== Early life ==
George Elden Packard was born in New Rochelle, New York, on February 23, 1944. He attended Hobart College in Geneva, New York, and graduated in 1966 with a Bachelor of Arts degree in history. At Hobart, he was elected to the Druids, the senior honor society.

== Military service ==
Soon after graduation, Packard enlisted in the Army. As an infantry officer, he served in Vietnam War with the First Division, and earned honors, including a Silver Star and two Bronze Stars for valor. After conclusion of his active duty, Packard attended Virginia Theological Seminary and continued to serve in the Army reserves, although disillusioned with that war. Upon ordination, as discussed below, he was transferred from the infantry to the chaplain corps. There, his service included assignments as installation chaplain and hospital chaplain, as well as with an operational unit and teaching at the Army Chaplain‘s School. Packard also served at the Pentagon full-time during Operation Desert Storm, and retired in 1996 with the rank of lieutenant colonel.

== Ministry ==
Shortly after receiving a Master of Divinity degree, Packard was ordained a deacon in June, 1974, and a priest the following December. After serving parishes in Lynchburg and Martinsville in the Episcopal Diocese of Southwestern Virginia, Packard served a rector for ten years at Grace Church, Hastings-on-Hudson, New York. He then accepted a position as the Canon to the Ordinary for the Diocese of New York from 1989 until 1995, when Packard resumed parish ministry at the Church of the Epiphany in Manhattan as well as nearer his home at Christ's Church, in Rye, New York, in addition to his military reserve duties. Packard also directed a social service agency in the Bronx, and studied for a degree in Psychiatry and Religion from Union Theological Seminary, as well as an honorary doctorate from the Virginia Theological Seminary in 2000.

Elected Fifth Bishop Suffragan for the Armed Services, Healthcare and Prison Ministries on September 28, 1999, Packard was consecrated on February 12, 2000, at the Cathedral Church of Saint Peter and Saint Paul, in Washington, DC, and served for ten years. Continuing the work of his predecessor, Bishop Charles L. Keyser, Bishop Packard traveled extensively to work with United States chaplains throughout the world, as well as continued to support the Russian military's new chaplaincy program. After the events of September 11, 2001, Bishop Packard declared “100 Days of Mission Support”, liaised with the Pentagon, and called on a wide range of talent both to serve responders in New York and at the 13 other affected dioceses directly affected by that day's acts of terrorism. His ministry also included work with chaplains at various federal prisons and Veterans Administration and Indian Health Service healthcare facilities. His successor, elected in 2010, was James B. Magness, although the title changed to Bishop Suffragan for Federal Ministries.

== Occupy movement ==
In late 2011, after protestors from Occupy Wall Street were evicted from Zuccotti Park, Bishop Packard attempted to negotiate their movement to Duarte Park (also known as LentSpace), a temporary park on land owned by Trinity Church whose development had stalled due to the 2008 financial crisis. On December 17, Bishop Packard used a ladder to scale a fence, along with other Occupy members, and was arrested by New York City Police Department officers. Trinity Church had denied the protesters permission to use the space as an open encampment, citing its lease with the Lower Manhattan Cultural Council (LMCC) and lack of sanitary facilities at the site, while allowing the protesters use of other facilities it owned in the neighborhood. Rt. Rev. Mr. Packard was convicted of trespassing and in June sentenced to four days community service. Bishop Packard was also arrested two other times in the Manhattan financial district: along with other Veterans for Peace on May 1, 2012, and in connection with an OccupyFaith meeting on the one-year anniversary of the Occupy Wall Street protests. He has served as the bishop-chaplain to The Episcopal Peace Fellowship.

== Personal life ==
Bishop Packard has two daughters from his first marriage and one child from his current marriage to Brook Hedick, an actress and singer-songwriter. Ms. Hedick has appeared in recent plays and musicals.

Episcopal Church (USA) titles
Preceded by Charles L. Keyser	Bishop of the Episcopal Diocese of the Armed Services and Federal Ministries; 2000 to 2010	Succeeded by Jay Magness
