= Jay Magness =

The Right Reverend Jay Magness
- Suffragan Bishop for Federal Ministries
- See: Episcopal Diocese of the Armed Services and Federal Ministries
- In office: June 2010 to 2017
- Predecessor: George Elden Packard
- Successor: Carl Wright

Orders
- Ordination: May 25, 1978 by William G. Weinhauer
- Consecration: June 19, 2010 by Katharine Jefferts Schori

Personal details
- Born: James Beattie Magness; October 21, 1946 (age 80) St. Petersburg, Florida
- Denomination: Anglicanism
- Spouse: Carolyn Magness
- Profession: Military chaplain

James Beattie "Jay" Magness (born October 21, 1946, in St. Petersburg, Florida) is an American Anglican bishop and former military chaplain. From 2010 to 2017 he served as Bishop Suffragan for the Armed Services and Federal Ministries of the Episcopal Church. As such, he was responsible for the Episcopal chaplains and their congregations in the U.S. Department of Defense, the U.S. Department of Veterans Affairs, and the Federal Bureau of Prisons. He previously served as a military chaplain in the United States Navy Chaplain Corps, from which he retired in 2004 with the rank of captain. He resigned from the Armed Forces and Federal Ministries and stepped down from his bishopric in 2017, at which time he was succeeded by Carl Wright.

He later served as assistant bishop of the Episcopal Diocese of Southern Virginia. From January 1, 2019 until February 1, 2020, he served as bishop pro-tempore of the diocese.

Magness joined the United States Navy in March 1966 and served in the Navy Supply Corps in Vietnam. He transitioned to the U.S. Naval Reserve in December 1969. He earned his BA degree from Western Carolina University in 1974 and his M.Div. degree from The Episcopal Theological Seminary of the Southwest in 1977.

He was ordained by Bishop William G. Weinhauer on May 25, 1978, and commissioned in the Navy Chaplain Corps on July 2, 1979. He later earned a D.Min. degree from the Gordon–Conwell Theological Seminary in 1999 with a concentration in Christian Leadership.

He has four grandchildren.

Episcopal Church (USA) titles
Preceded by George Elden Packard	Bishop of the Episcopal Diocese of the Armed Services and Federal Ministries; 2010 to 2017	Succeeded by Carl Wright
