= Monopoli railway station =

Railway station in Monopoli, Italy

Monopoli
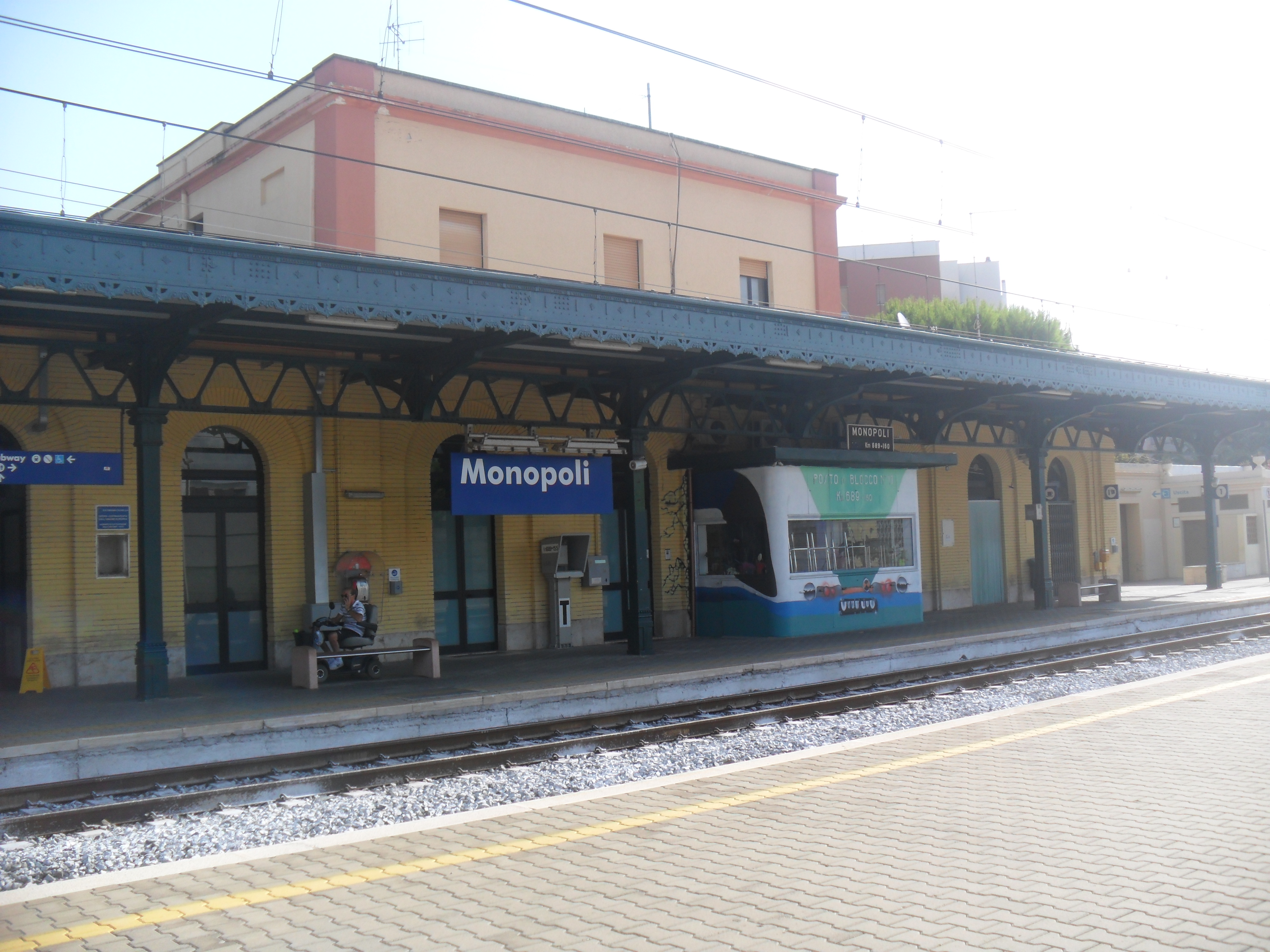

General information
- Location: Monopoli; Monopoli, Bari, Apulia; Italy
- Coordinates: 40°57′09″N 17°17′31″E
- Operator: Rete Ferroviaria Italiana
- Line: Ancona–Lecce (Trenitalia)
- Platforms: 4
- Train operators: Trenitalia

Other information
- Classification: Bronze

History
- Opened: 1865; 161 years ago
Location
- Location within Apulia Location within Italy

Monopoli (Italian: Stazione di Monopoli) is a railway station in the Italian town of Monopoli, in the Province of Bari, Apulia. The station lies on the Adriatic Railway (Ancona–Lecce). The train services are operated by Trenitalia.

== Train services ==
The station is served by the following service(s):

- Intercity services Bologna - Rimini - Ancona - Pescara - Foggia - Bari - Brindisi - Lecce
- Night train (Intercity Night) Rome - Foggia - Bari - Brindisi - Lecce
- Night train (Intercity Night) Milan - Parma - Bologna - Ancona - Pescara - Foggia - Bari - Brindisi - Lecce
- Night train (Intercity Night) Turin - Alessandria - Bologna - Ancona - Pescara - Foggia - Bari - Brindisi - Lecce
- Regional services (Treno regionale) Bari - Monopoli - Brindisi - Lecce

== See also ==
- Railway stations in Italy
- List of railway stations in Apulia
- Rail transport in Italy
- History of rail transport in Italy
