= Charles L. Burgreen =

American bishop

Charles L. Burgreen (March 6, 1924 – January 20, 2006) was suffragan bishop for the Armed Forces in the Episcopal Church of the United States of America. He was made a deacon in 1946 and ordained to the priesthood in 1948. He was consecrated to the episcopate in 1978 with John Allin as chief consecrator.
