= Carlo Maggi =

16th-century Venetian traveller

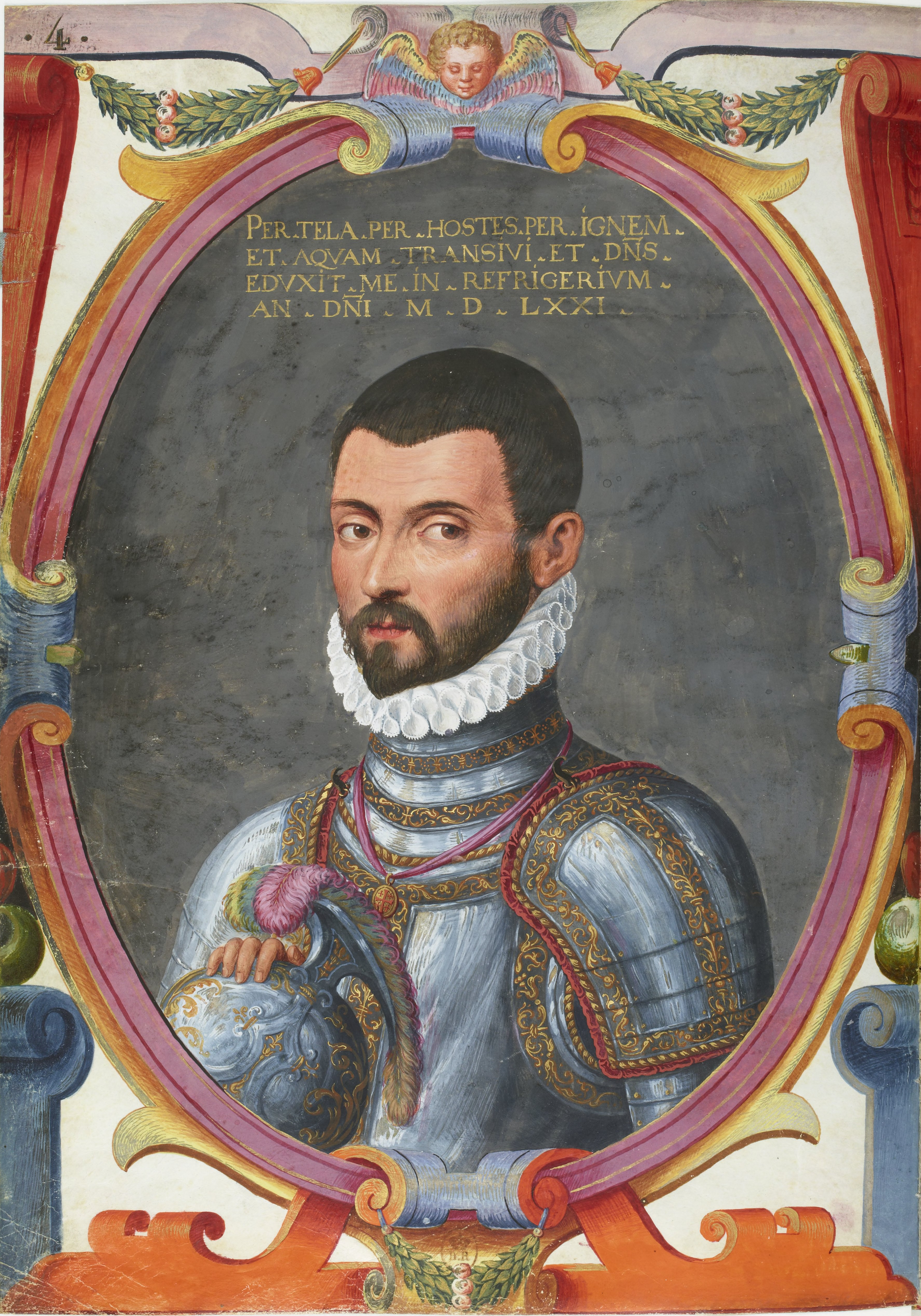
Portrait from the Codex Maggi (Voyages et aventures de Ch. Magius, Bibliothèque nationale de France, département Estampes et photographie, RESERVE 4-AD-134, miniature no. 4)

Carlo Maggi (Latinized Carolus Magius, d. c. 1587) was a Venetian citizen ("cittadino originario") and traveller. During 1568–1573, he visited much of the Near East, then under Ottoman control, including the city of Jerusalem, where he was made a Knight of the Order of the Holy Sepulchre. He was captured by the Turks during the siege of the city of Nicosia in the Cyprus War of 1570-1571, being able to free himself and to get back to Venice only after the Battle of Lepanto in 1572.

He compiled a short travelogue in manuscript form in 1578, known as the Codex Maggi, now kept in the Bibliothèque nationale de France. The manuscript consists of 18 miniatures by a Flemish or a Venetian master, showing scenes of Maggi's travels. A French commentary on the manuscript was published by Louis César de La Baume Le Blanc in 1761.
