= List of companies of Albania =

Albania's transition from a socialist centrally planned economy to a capitalist mixed economy has been largely successful. "Formal non-agricultural employment in the private sector more than doubled between 1999 and 2013," notes the World Bank, with much of this expansion powered by foreign investment.

For further information on the types of business entities in this country and their abbreviations, see Business entities in Albania.

== Notable companies ==
This list includes notable companies with primary headquarters located in the country. The industry and sector follow the Industry Classification Benchmark taxonomy. Organizations which have ceased operations are included and noted as defunct.

Notable companies Status: P=Private, S=State; A=Active, D=Defunct
Name	Industry	Sector	Headquarters	Founded	Notes	Status	
A1 Report	Consumer services	Broadcasting & entertainment	Tirana	2002	Television	P	A
ABC News	Consumer services	Broadcasting & entertainment	Tirana	2010	Television	P	A
Ada Air	Consumer services	Airlines	Tirana	1991	First Albanian airline, defunct 2007	P	D
Air Albania	Consumer services	Airlines	Tirana	2018	National carrier, defunct 2025	P	D
Albanian Development Bank	Financials	Banks	Tirana	2025	Development bank	S	A
Albanian Airlines	Consumer services	Airlines	Tirana	1991	National carrier, defunct 2011	P	D
Albanian Screen	Consumer services	Broadcasting & entertainment	Tirana	2003	Television	P	A
Albanian-American Enterprise Fund	Financials	Equity investment instruments	Tirana	1995	Private development	P	A
Albatros Airways	Consumer services	Airlines	Tirana	2004	Low-cost airline, defunct 2006	P	D
Albawings	Consumer services	Airlines	Tirana	2015	Airline	P	D
AlbChrome	Basic materials	Iron & steel	Tirana	1948	Mining, heavy industry	P	A
Albanian Mobile Communications	Telecomunitcations	Mobile telecommunications	Tirana	1996	Telecommunications, defunct 2015	P	D
Albanian Power Corporation	Utilities	Conventional electricity	Tirana	1957	Electrical distributor, state-owned	S	A
Albcontrol	Industrials	Transportation services	Tirana	1992	National air traffic agency	P	A
Albpetrol	Oil & gas	Exploration & production	Patos	1992	Petroleum production	P	A
Albtelecom	Telecommunications	Fixed line telecommunications	Tirana	1912	Privatized state provider	P	A
Antea Cement	Industrials	Building materials & fixtures	Fushë-Krujë	2007	Cement, part of Titan Cement (Greece)	P	A
Balfin Group	Financials	Investment	Tirana	1993		P	A
Bank of Albania	Financials	Banks	Tirana	1925	Central bank	S	A
Banka Kombëtare Tregtare	Financials	Banks	Tirana	1925	Commercial bank, part of Çalık Holding (Turkey)	P	A
Belle Air	Consumer services	Airlines	Tirana	2005	Airline, defunct 2013	P	D
Big Market	Consumer goods	Food retailers & wholesalers	Tirana	1999	Largest supermarket chain of Albania	P	A
Birra Kaon	Consumer goods	Brewers	Tirana	1995	Brewery	P	A
Birra Korça	Consumer goods	Brewers	Korçë	1928	Brewery	P	A
Birra Tirana	Consumer goods	Brewers	Tirana	1961	Brewery	P	A
Coca-Cola Bottling Shqipëria	Consumer goods	Soft drinks	Kashar	1994	Bottling company	P	A
Credins Bank	Financials	Banks	Tirana	2003	Private bank	P	A
Digitalb	Consumer services	Broadcasting & entertainment	Tirana	2004	Television	P	A
Eagle Mobile	Telecommunications	Mobile telecommunications	Tirana	2008	Mobile telephony, part of Albtelecom	P	A
Eco Market	Consumer goods	Food retailers & wholesalers	Tirana	2013	Supermarket chain	P	A
Electric Power Distribution Operator	Utilities	Conventional electricity	Tirana	2008	Electrical distributor, state-owned	S	A
Hekurudha Shqiptare	Industrials	Railroads	Durrës	1945	Railways	S	A
Ferlut SH. a.	Industrials	Transportation	Tirana	1992	Transportation	S	A
Civil Aviation Authority (Albania)	Industrials	Transportation	Tirana	1991	Transportation	S	A
Intesa Sanpaolo Bank Albania	Financials	Banks	Tirana	2008	Bank, previously American Bank of Albania	P	A
Kastrati Group	Retail and wholesale trader of hydrocarbon products	insurance, construction and real estate development, infrastructure development, tourism and hospitality, and automotive distribution.	Tirana	1991		P	A
MEICO	Industrials	Defense	Tirana	1991	Defense exports	S	A
Neptun Electronics	Consumer goods	Consumer electronics	Tirana	2001	Largest electronic retailer in Albania	P	A
News 24	Consumer services	Broadcasting & entertainment	Tirana	2002	Television	P	A
Plus Communication	Telecommunications	Mobile telecommunications	Tirana	2009		P	A
Port of Durrës	Industrials	Transportation services	Durrës	2003	Authority operators of the largest port in Albania	P	A
Posta Shqiptare	Industrials	Delivery services	Tirana	1912	Postal services	S	A
Raiffeisen Albania	Financials	Banks	Tirana	2004	Bank, part of Raiffeisen Zentralbank (Austria)	P	A
Radio Televizioni Shqiptar	Consumer services	Broadcasting & entertainment	Tirana	1938	Publicly Owned State Funded	S	A
SIGAL	Financials	Full line insurance	Tirana	1999	Insurance company	P	A
Star Airways	Consumer services	Airlines	Tirana	2008	Airline, defunct 2010	P	D
SuperSport Albania	Consumer services	Broadcasting & entertainment	Tirana	2004	Part of Digitalb	P	A
Taçi Oil	Oil & gas	Exploration & production	Tirana	2003	Exploration, production and marketing	P	A
Tafa Air	Consumer services	Airlines	Tirana	2009	Airline, defunct 2010	P	D
Telekom Albania	Telecommunications	Mobile telecommunications	Tirana	2015	Mobile, part of Deutsch Telekom (Germany)	P	A
TIMAK (Albania)	Industrials	Machinery: Industrials	Tirana	2016		P	A
Tirana Bank	Financials	Banks	Tirana	1996	Bank, part of Piraeus Bank (Greece)	P	A
Top Channel	Consumer services	Broadcasting & entertainment	Tirana	2002	Television, part of Digitalb	P	A
TV Klan	Consumer services	Broadcasting & entertainment	Tirana	1997	Television	P	A
Union Bank (Albania)	Financials	Banks	Tirana	2006	EBRD Owns 12.5%	P	A
United Bank of Albania	Financials	Banks	Tirana	1994	40% of shares gone to Islamic Development Bank	P	A
Vizion Plus	Consumer services	Broadcasting & entertainment	Tirana	1999	Television	P	A
Vodafone Albania	Telecommunications	Mobile telecommunications	Tirana	2001	Part of Vodafone (UK)	P	A

== Gallery ==
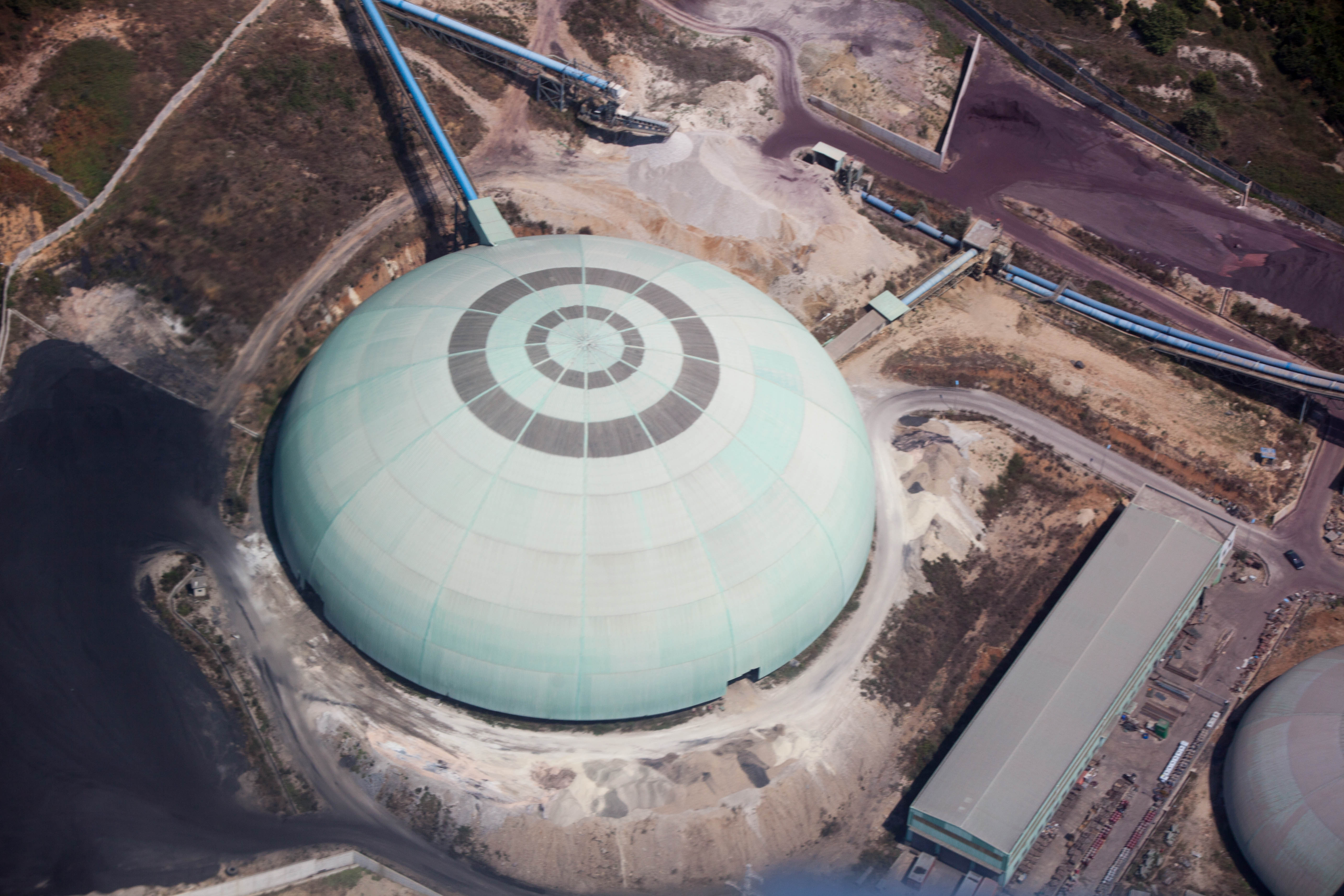
The Antea Cement factory in Fushë-Krujë

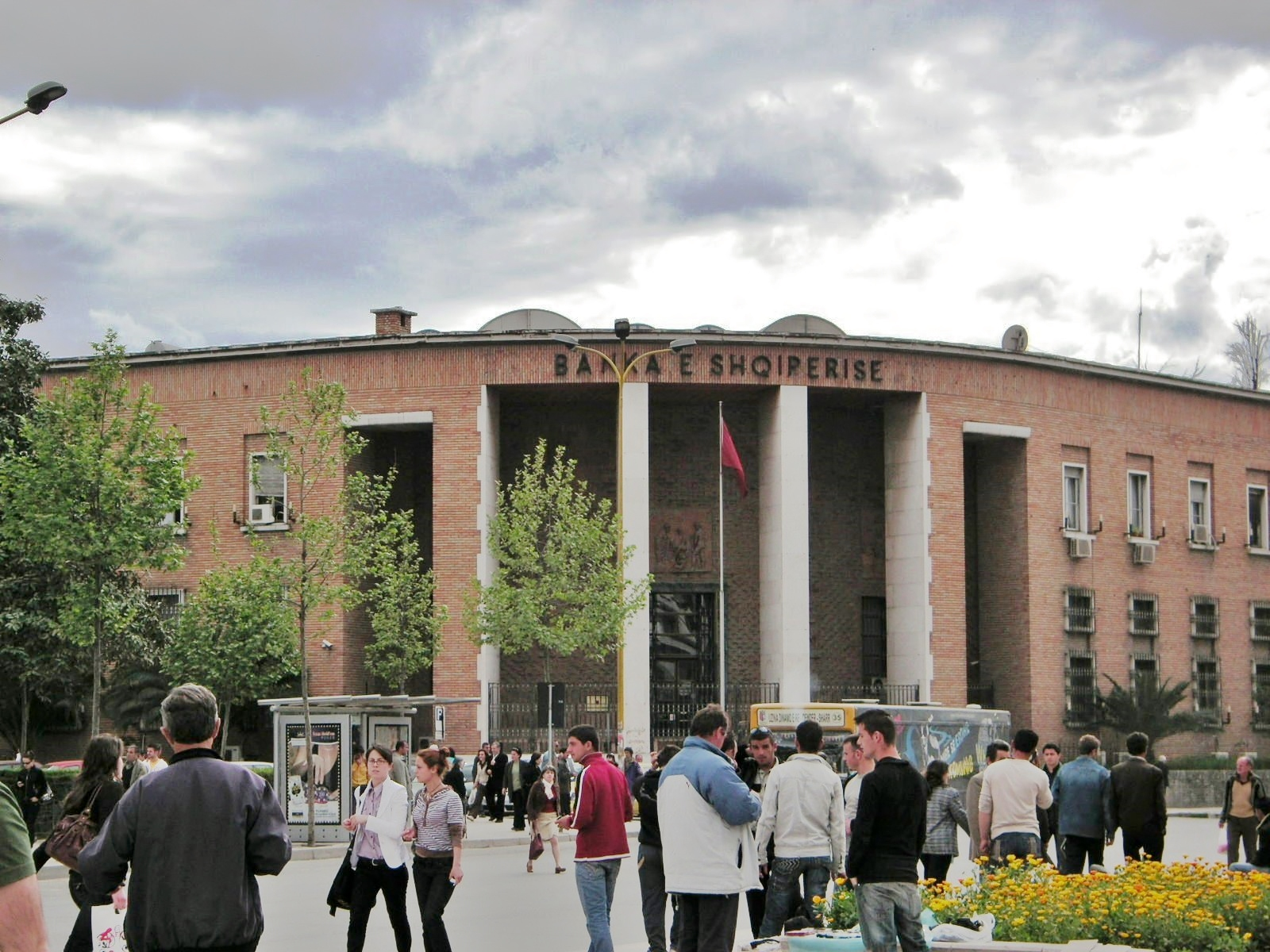
The Bank of Albania, in Tirana's Skanderbeg Square

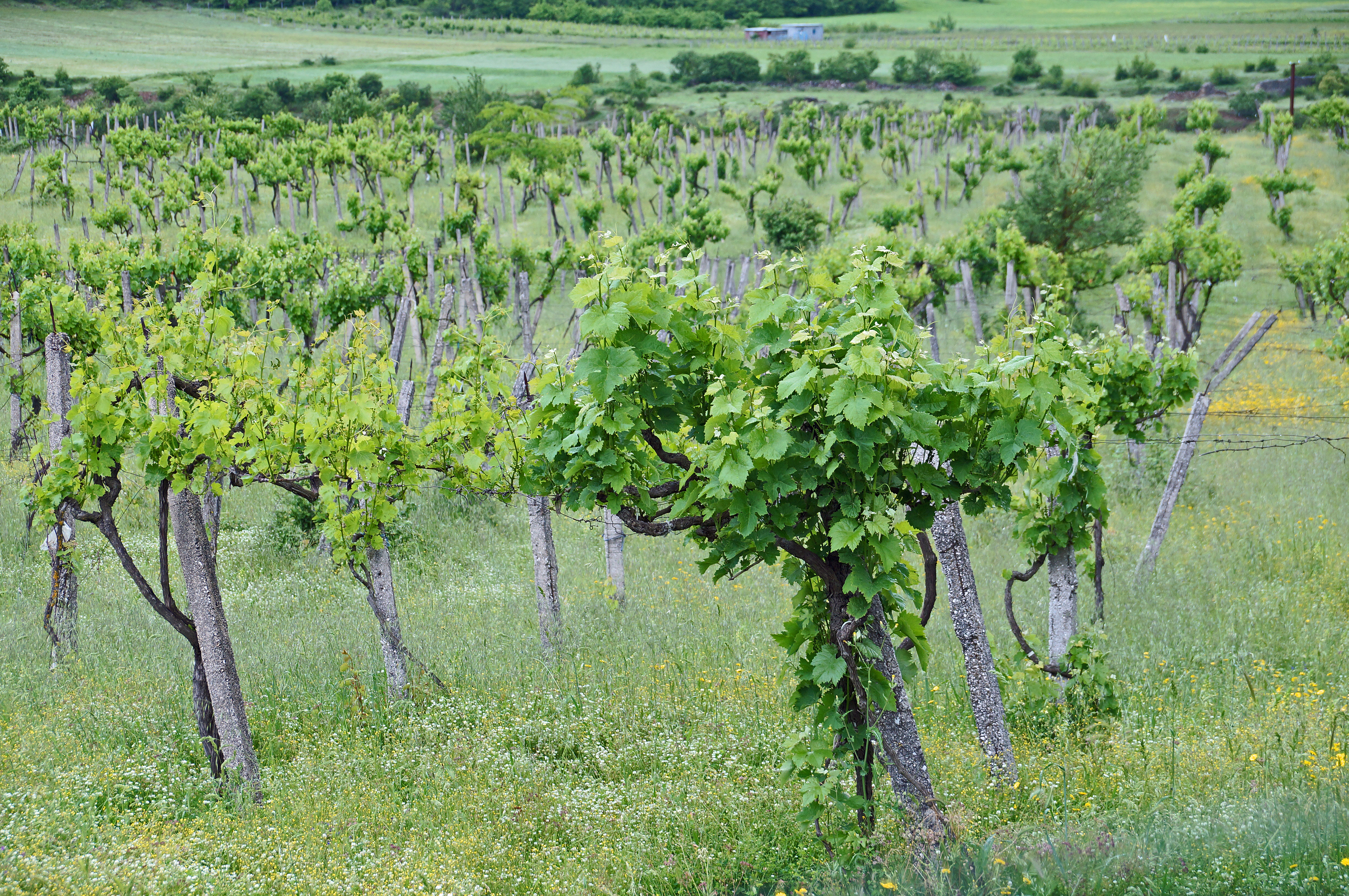
Vinyard in Përmet

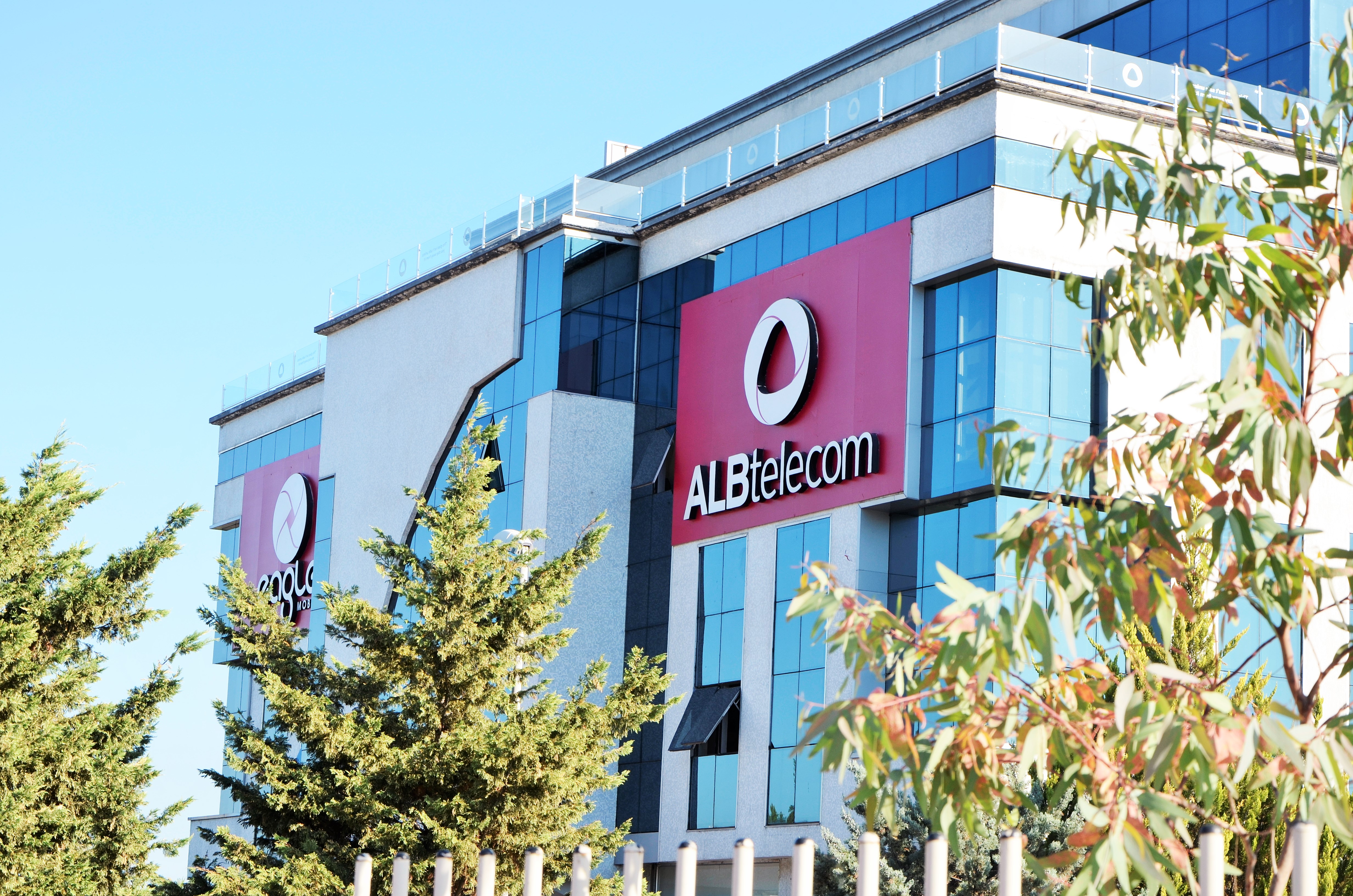
ALBtelecom headquarters in Kashar, Tirana

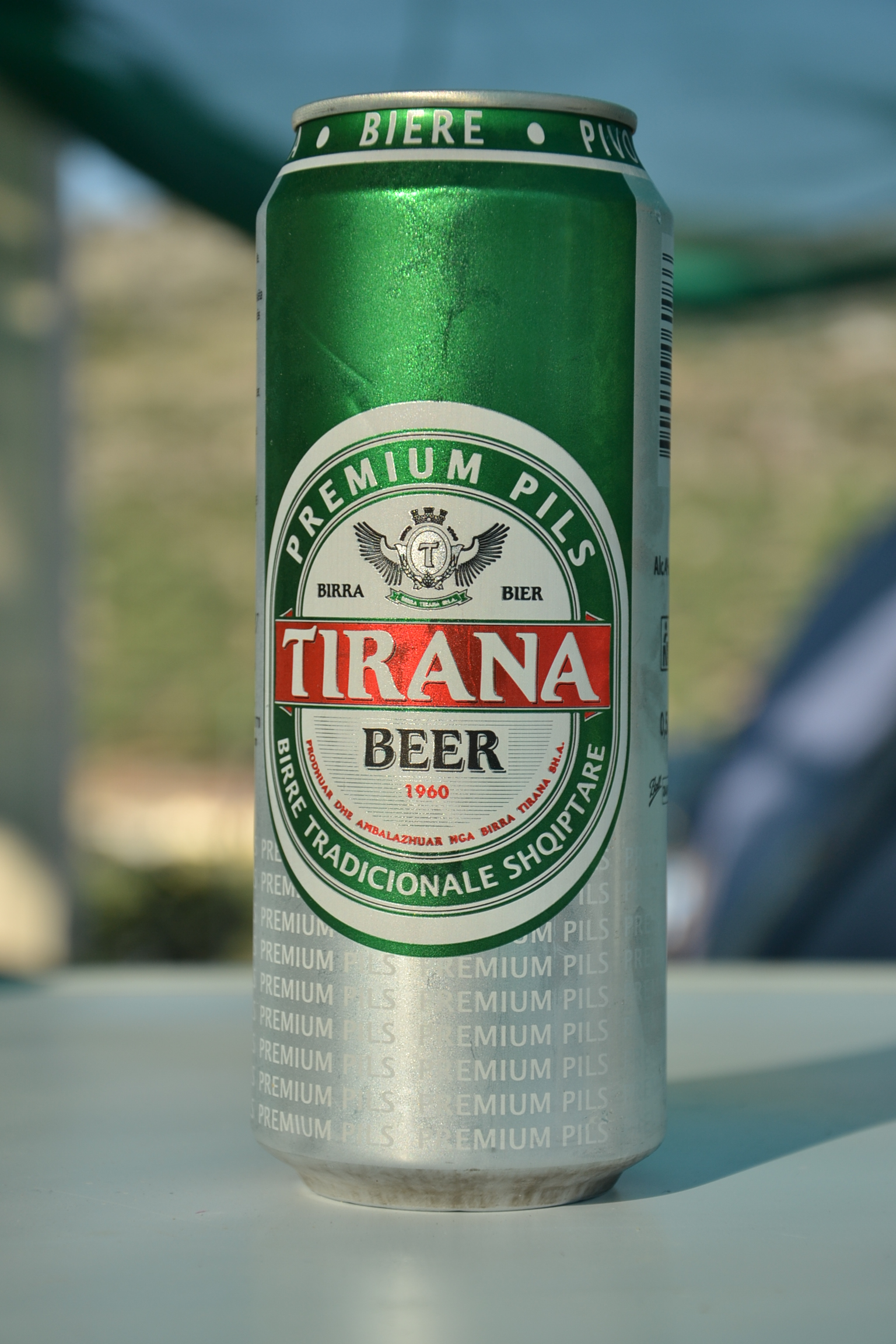
Birra Tirana

== See also ==
- Category:Albanian brands
- List of airlines of Albania
- List of banks in Albania
- List of supermarket chains in Albania
