= List of airlines of Albania =

This is a list of airlines which have at some point had an air operator's certificate issued by the Civil Aviation Authority of Albania. As of December 2025, Albania has no active airlines.

== Defunct airlines ==
Airline	Image	IATA	ICAO	Callsign	Commenced operations	Ceased operations	Notes
Arberia Airways/Airline			ABE	Arberia Airways/Airline	1991	1995	First Albanian airline
Ada Air (Adalbanair)		ZY	ADE	ADA AIR	1992	2007	First operational Albanian airline
Air Albania		ZB	ABN	AIR ALBANIA	2018	2025	Low Cost Flag Carrier. Ceased operations on December 10, 2025.
Albanian Airlines		LV	LBC	ALBANIAN	1992	2011	
Albatros Airways		4H	LBW	ALBANWAYS	2004	2006	
Albtransport		AT			1960	2000	Government agency merged with Arberia to create Albanian Airlines
Albawings		2B	AWT	ALBAWINGS	2016	2024	Low Cost Carrier. Ceased operations on January 12, 2024.
Belle Air		LZ	LBY	ALBAN-BELLE	2005	2013	
Star Airways		4S	STB		2010	2010	
Tafa Air					2009	2010	

== See also ==
- List of airlines
