= Unaza busline =

Bus line in Tirana, Albania

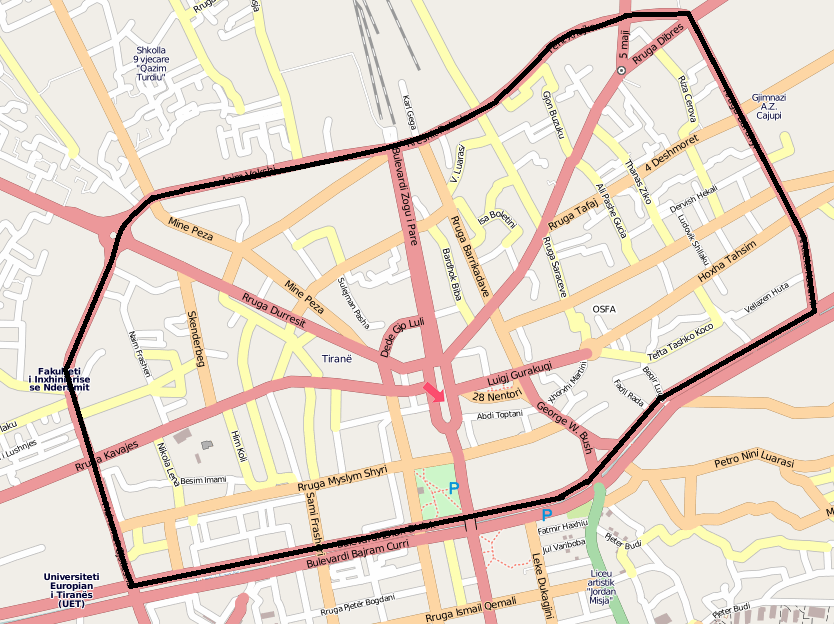

Overview
- Operator: Ferlut SH. a.

Route
- Locale: Tirana
- Communities served: Kombinat; Ish-Blloku; Ali Demi; Pazari i Ri
- Length: 7.5 km (4.7 mi)

Service
- Level: Daily
- Frequency: 5–10 minutes
- Weekend frequency: 5–10 minutes
- Journey time: approx. 30 minutes
- Operates: 5:30 am – 24:00 pm
The Unaza busline
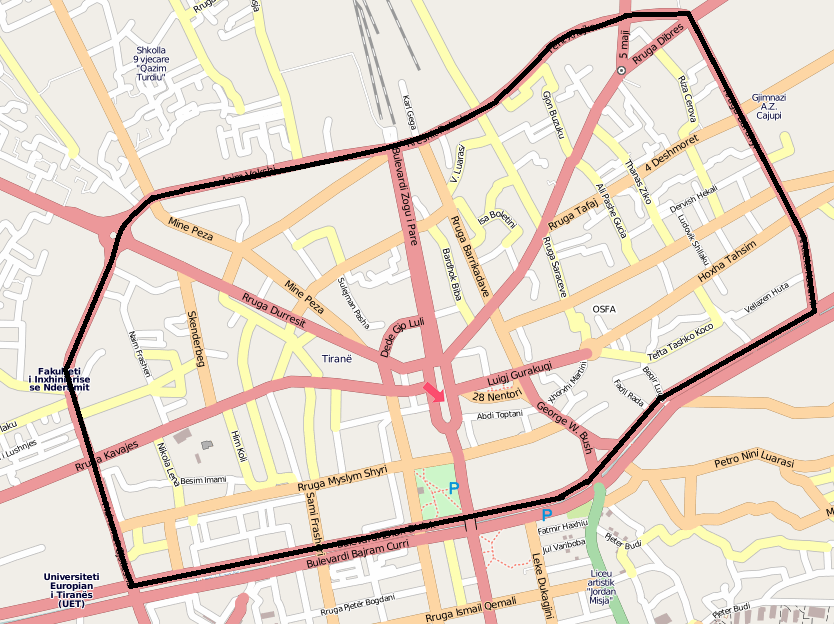

The Unaza busline is a bus line located in Tirana, Albania. The line runs along the ring from the north of the city (Mother Teresa hospital and Rilindja square) to Lana River. Busses drive in both clockwise and counterclockwise direction.

The length of a round-trip on the bus is 7.5 km, and it is operated by Ferlut.

== See also ==
- Bus lines in Tirana
