= Fusha (disambiguation) =

Fusha is the Arabic name for Modern Standard Arabic.

Fusha may also refer to:

- Classical Arabic
- Fusha, Guangdong (Chinese: 阜沙鎮), a town in the city of Zhongshan, Guangdong Province of China
- Fushë-Krujë, Albania
