= List of banks in Albania =

The following list of banks in Albania is as published by the Bank of Albania, the bank supervisory authority of Albania, on their website as of 2 April 2026.

== List of banks ==
Name	Total Assets (2022)	Capital	Website
Albanian Development Bank (Banka Shqiptare e Zhvillimit)	_	(Albania)	adb.al/
Banka Amerikane e Investimeve (American Bank of Investments / ABI)	116,270 mln ALL	(United States)	abi.al
Banka Kombëtare Tregtare (BKT)	491,470 mln ALL	(Albania)	bkt.com.al
Banka Credins	297,740 mln ALL	(Albania)	bankacredins.com
Banka e Parë e Investimeve Albania (Fibank), subsidiary of First Investment Bank	50,122 mln ALL	(Bulgaria)	fibank.al
Banka Intesa Sanpaolo Albania	192,800 mln ALL	(Italy)	intesasanpaolobank.al
Banka Procredit, subsidiary of ProCredit Bank	40,940 mln ALL	(Germany)	procreditbank.com.al
Banka Raiffeisen, subsidiary of Raiffeisen Bank International	281,580 mln ALL	(Austria)	raiffeisen.al
Banka OTP Albania, subsidiary of OTP Bank	176,630 mln ALL	(Hungary)	otpbank.al
Banka Tirana (Tirana Bank)	114,700 mln ALL	(Albania)	tiranabank.al
Banka Union (UnionBank)	91,852 mln ALL	(Albania)	unionbank.al
Banka e Bashkuar e Shqipërisë (United Bank of Albania, UBA)	__ mln ALL	(Albania)	uba.com.al
Banka Jet (Jet Bank)	__ mln ALL	(Netherlands)	jet.bank
Ziraat Bank Albania	_ mln ALL	(Turkey)	ziraatbank.com.al

== Defunct banks ==
- National bank of Albania (1925-1945)
- State Bank of Albania (1945-1992)
- International Commercial Bank Albania (1997-2019)
- Credit Bank of Albania (2003-2019)

== See also ==
- List of banks in Europe
