= Coca-Cola Bottling Shqipëria =

Company bottling soft drinks in Albania

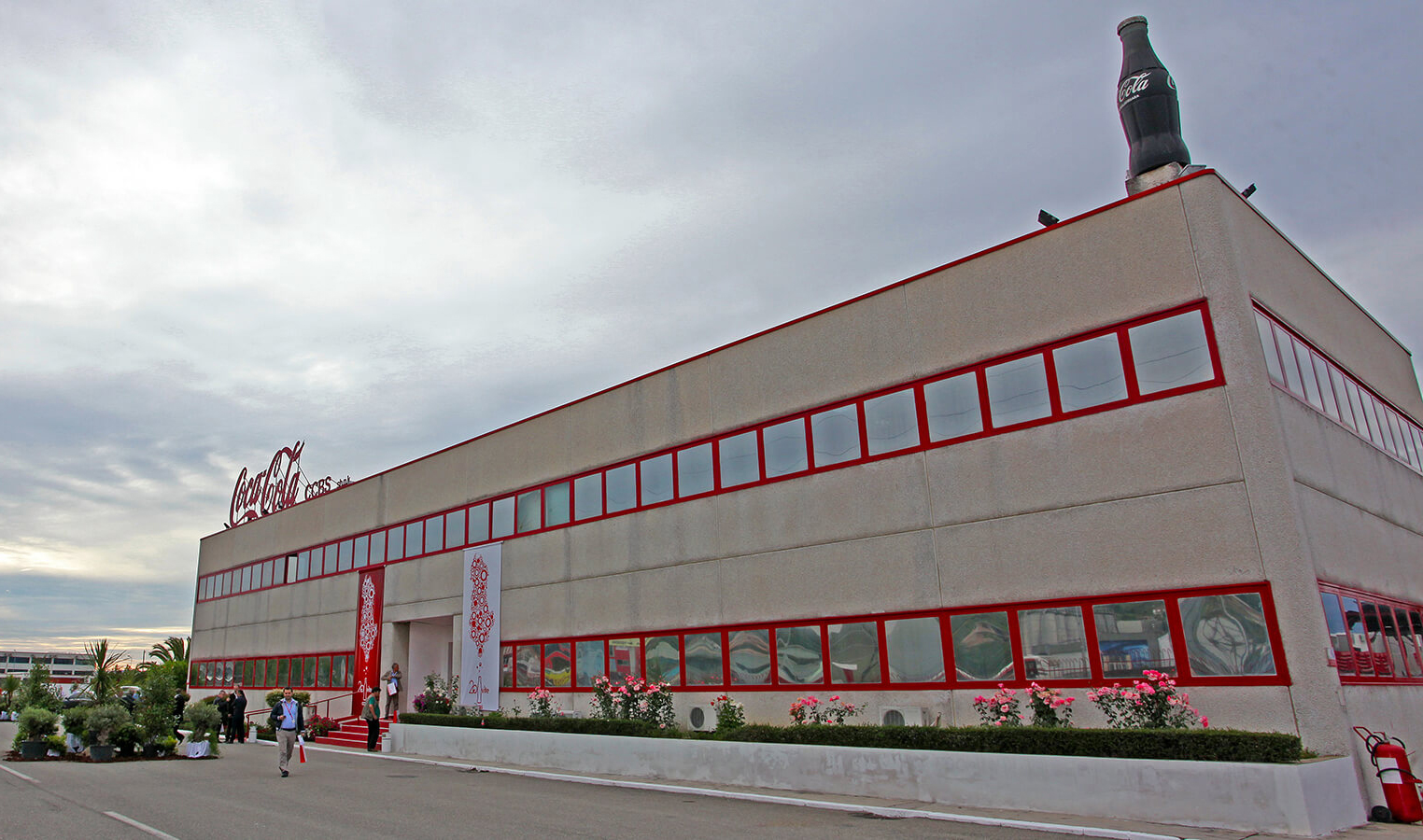
- Coca-Cola headquarters in Albania
- Type: Joint venture
- Founded: 1994; 32 years ago
- Headquarters: Kashar, Albania,
- Key people: Luca Busi (president); Cristina Busi (administrator); Luigi Verardo (CEO)
- Products: Alcohol Free Beverages
- Revenue: ▲$22 million (2013)
- Net income: ▲$16.8 million (2013)
- Owner: Sibeg (74.69%); The Coca-Cola Company (25.31%)
- Number of employees: 304
- Website: ccbs.al

Coca-Cola Bottling Shqipëria, formerly known as Coca-Cola Bottling Enterprise Tirana (CCBET), is an Albanian-based company engaged in bottling and distribution of Coca-Cola soft drink brands in partnership with Sibeg and Acies groups.

The company has operated since 1994, when it produced its first bottle of Coca Cola. Through the production chain and the local business network, it has built a network of over 300 employees. Considering the size and distribution network, CCBS represents one of the main driving forces for the developing of the Albanian economy.

Brand includes Coca-Cola, Coca-Cola Zero, Fanta, Sprite, Schweppes, Cappy Pulpy (imported from Romania), Nestea (imported from Greece), Efes Beer (imported from Turkey) and Monster Energy (imported from Romania).

== See also ==
- Economy of Albania
- Companies of Albania
