= Air Albania =

National airline of Albania, 2018–2025

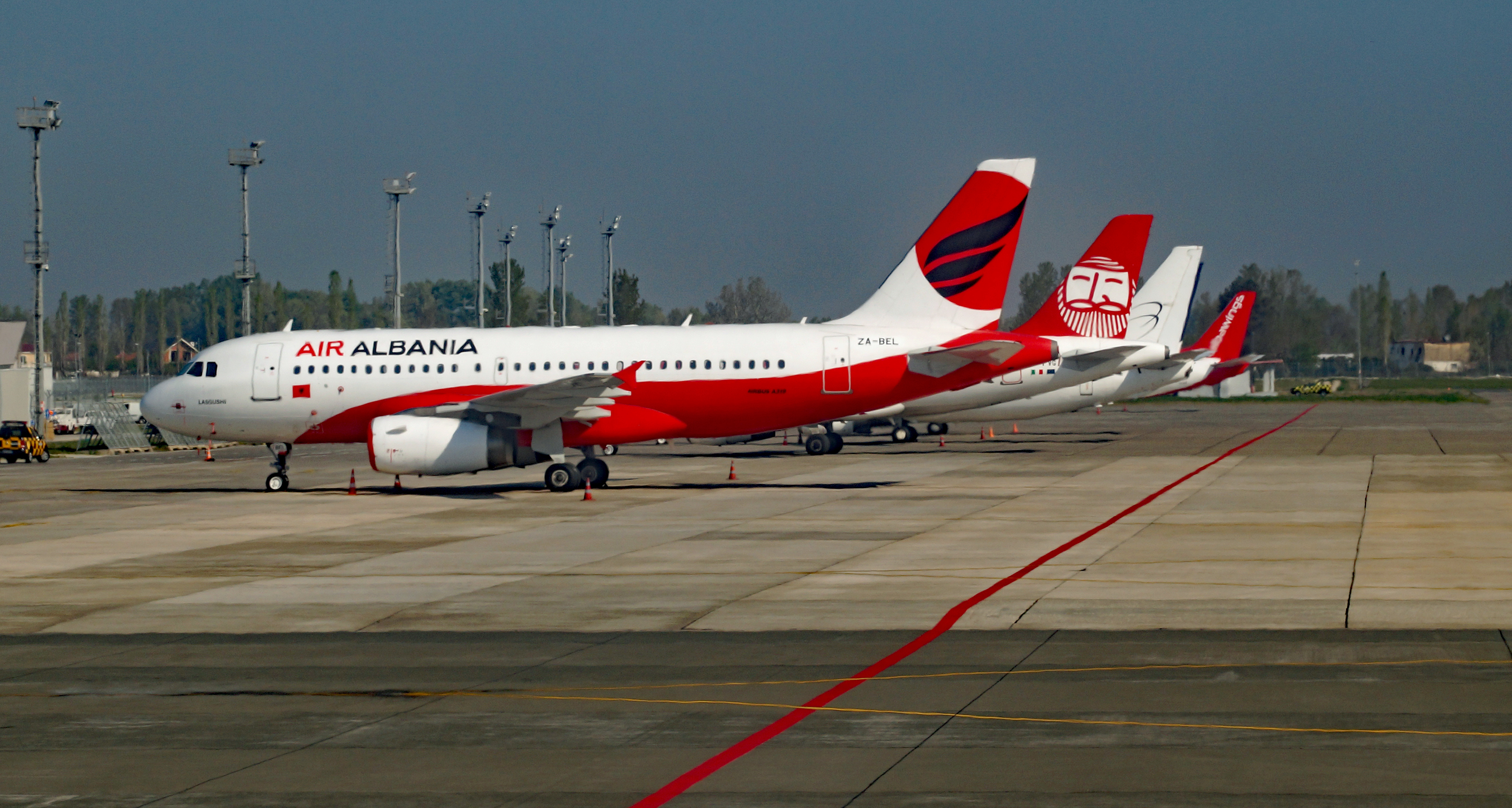
- Airbus A319
| IATA | ICAO | Call sign |
|---|---|---|
| ZB | ABN | AIR ALBANIA |
- Founded: 16 May 2018; 8 years ago
- Commenced operations: 14 September 2018; 8 years ago
- Ceased operations: 10 December 2025
- Hubs: Tirana International Airport Nënë Tereza
- Fleet size: 1
- Destinations: 13
- Headquarters: Tirana, Albania
- Key people: Sinan Isik (CEO)
- Employees: 140
- Website: airalbania.com.al

Air Albania was the flag carrier of Albania, established in 2018 as a public–private partnership with Turkish Airlines. Based at Tirana International Airport Nënë Tereza, the airline served several European destinations.

By late 2025, Air Albania faced financial difficulties and legal disputes, and Turkish Airlines withdrew its shareholding. In December 2025, the Albanian Civil Aviation Authority suspended the carrier’s operations indefinitely for non-compliance with civil aviation standards.

== History ==
=== Establishment and first operations ===
After the collapse of the former Albanian national airline Albanian Airlines in 2011, the Government of Albania moved to establish a successor. On 30 March 2017, Prime Minister Edi Rama announced plans to create a new state-backed airline in partnership with Turkish Airlines. A joint press statement on 8 May 2017 confirmed the agreement, and on 21 November 2017 the new airline’s name was revealed: Air Albania.

Air Albania was formally established on 16 May 2018 under a public–private partnership. Ownership was split: Turkish Airlines held 49%, the Albanian state-owned company Albcontrol held 10% and the rest belonged to private firm MDN Investment 41%.

Albania's national competition authority cleared the airline's creation in September 2018. The airline’s base and headquarters were established at Tirana International Airport Nënë Tereza in Tirana. Operations began on 14 September 2018, with the inaugural flight on the Tirana–Istanbul route with an Airbus A319.

On 8 May 2020, Air Albania obtained a Third Country Operator (TCO) certificate from the European Union Aviation Safety Agency, enabling it to operate flights between Albania and European Union member states.

Over the years Air Albania expanded and contracted its route network; by 2025 its operations had reportedly narrowed mostly to flights between Tirana and Istanbul, after several cancellations and shrinking demand dominated by low-cost carriers.

=== Troubles, ownership change and suspension (2022–2025) ===
On 1 September 2022, the airline’s business licence was suspended by Albanian authorities because it failed to declare its ultimate beneficial owners as required by revised corporate-ownership transparency laws. The suspension was lifted on 14 September 2022 after the airline submitted the required documentation.

By late 2025 the airline faced mounting financial and legal pressure. On 19 November 2025, Turkish Airlines announced it was divesting its entire 49 % stake in Air Albania, prompting a search for new investors.

Then, in early December 2025, the national civil aviation regulator, Civil Aviation Authority (Albania), suspended Air Albania’s operational license indefinitely, citing failure to comply with required civil aviation and regulatory standards. The airline has reportedly not operated flights since 7 December 2025.

As of December 2025, the future of Air Albania appears uncertain: with the major shareholder gone, mounting debts, and a suspended licence, the airline’s continued existence seems doubtful.

=== Decline and suspension ===
From 2023 onward, Air Albania faced mounting operational and financial difficulties that progressively undermined the sustainability of the airline. By mid-2025, the carrier’s market position had weakened significantly as low-cost airlines expanded aggressively in Albania, reducing Air Albania’s market share from earlier peaks to an estimated 3–4%. The airline also cancelled several routes and, by late 2025, was operating a largely reduced network, with many scheduled destinations no longer being served.

Concerns about the company’s financial transparency became more prominent in 2025. The opposition and several media outlets accused the airline of failing to publish audited financial statements for several years, raising questions about profitability and compliance with reporting obligations. A separate investigation reported that an overbilling dispute between the airline and a catering provider had contributed to increased losses, with a court decision later confirming irregularities in invoicing and highlighting weaknesses in the airline’s internal financial controls.

By late 2025, Air Albania also became the subject of international legal disputes. An American leasing company filed suit in a British court, alleging that the airline had stopped paying lease instalments for two Airbus aircraft earlier in the year; industry reports indicated that at least one aircraft was subsequently repossessed by its lessor. These developments further restricted the airline’s ability to maintain regular operations and signalled deteriorating liquidity.

Parallel to these financial difficulties, structural concerns about the airline’s ownership and governance persisted. Transparency monitors previously criticised the manner in which the airline’s founding private shareholder, MDN Investment, was selected, noting that the company had been formed only days before acquiring its stake and that the arrangement potentially conflicted with public procurement and state-aid norms.

A turning point came on 19 November 2025, when Turkish Airlines announced that it would sell its entire 49% stake in Air Albania, withdrawing from the partnership that had underpinned the airline’s formation and early operations. The announcement accelerated speculation that the airline was nearing insolvency. At the time of Turkish Airlines' opt-out from their the 49.12% share, the remaining shares were held by the Albanian private company MDN Investment (41%) and the government-owned Albcontrol (10%)

On 10 December 2025, the Albanian Civil Aviation Authority suspended Air Albania’s operating license indefinitely, citing the carrier’s failure to comply with national civil aviation and regulatory standards. The suspension followed several days during which the airline had already cancelled all scheduled flights. As of December 2025, Air Albania has not resumed operations, prompting widespread assessment that the airline had effectively collapsed.

== Destinations ==
Air Albania flew to the following destinations:

| Country | City | Airport | Notes | Ref. |
|---|---|---|---|---|
| Albania | Tirana | Tirana International Airport Nënë Tereza | Hub | |
| Albania | Kukës | Kukës International Airport Zayed | Seasonal | |
| Austria | Vienna | Vienna International Airport | | |
| Belgium | Brussels | Brussels Airport | | |
| Germany | Düsseldorf | Düsseldorf Airport | Seasonal | |
| Greece | Athens | Athens International Airport | | |
| Italy | Bergamo | Milan Bergamo Airport | | |
| Italy | Bologna | Bologna Guglielmo Marconi Airport | | |
| Italy | Milan | Milan Malpensa Airport | | |
| Italy | Pisa | Pisa International Airport | | |
| Italy | Rome | Rome Fiumicino Airport | | |
| Italy | Venice | Treviso Airport | | |
| Italy | Verona | Verona Villafranca Airport | | |
| Switzerland; France; Germany | Basel; Mulhouse; Freiburg | EuroAirport Basel Mulhouse Freiburg | Seasonal | |
| Switzerland | Geneva | Geneva Airport | | |
| Turkey | Ankara | Ankara Airport | | |
| Turkey | Antalya | Antalya Airport | Seasonal | |
| Turkey | Istanbul | Istanbul Airport | | |
| Turkey | İzmir | İzmir Adnan Menderes Airport | | |
| United Kingdom | London | Gatwick Airport | | |

Air Albania additionally maintained a codeshare agreement with Turkish Airlines.

== Fleet ==
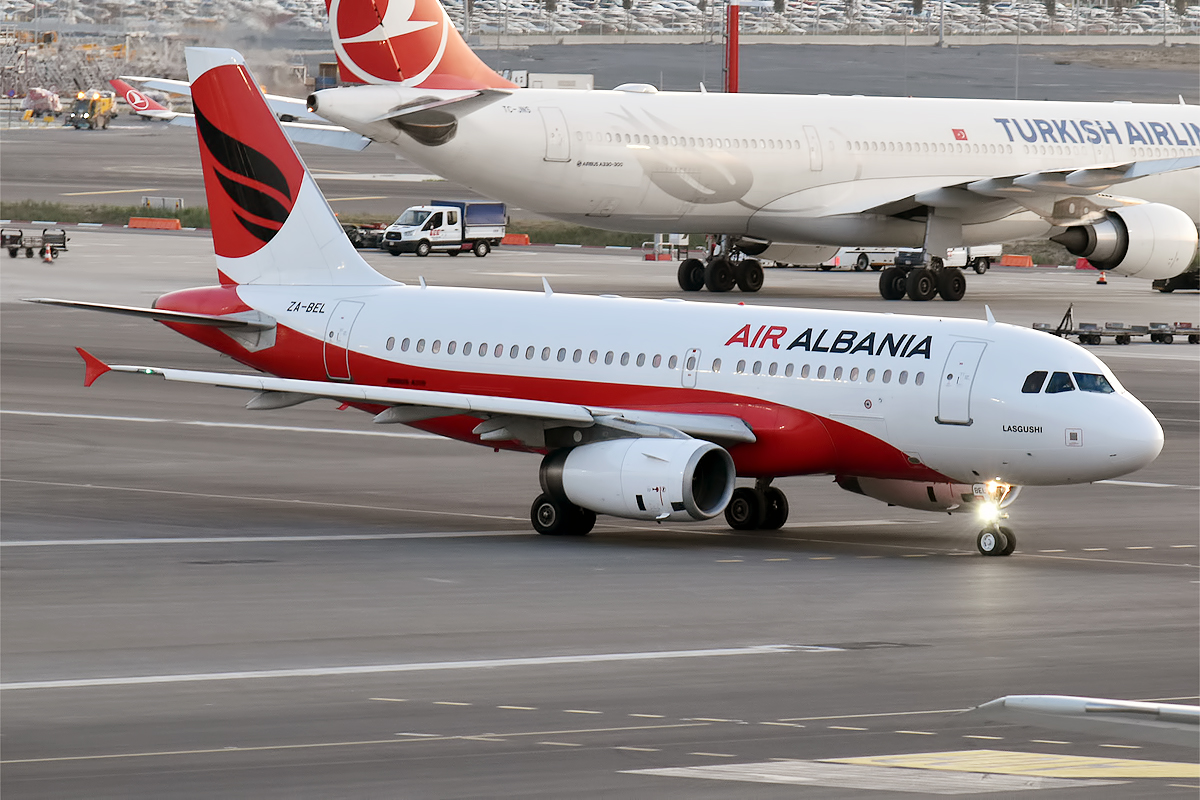
Airbus A319-100

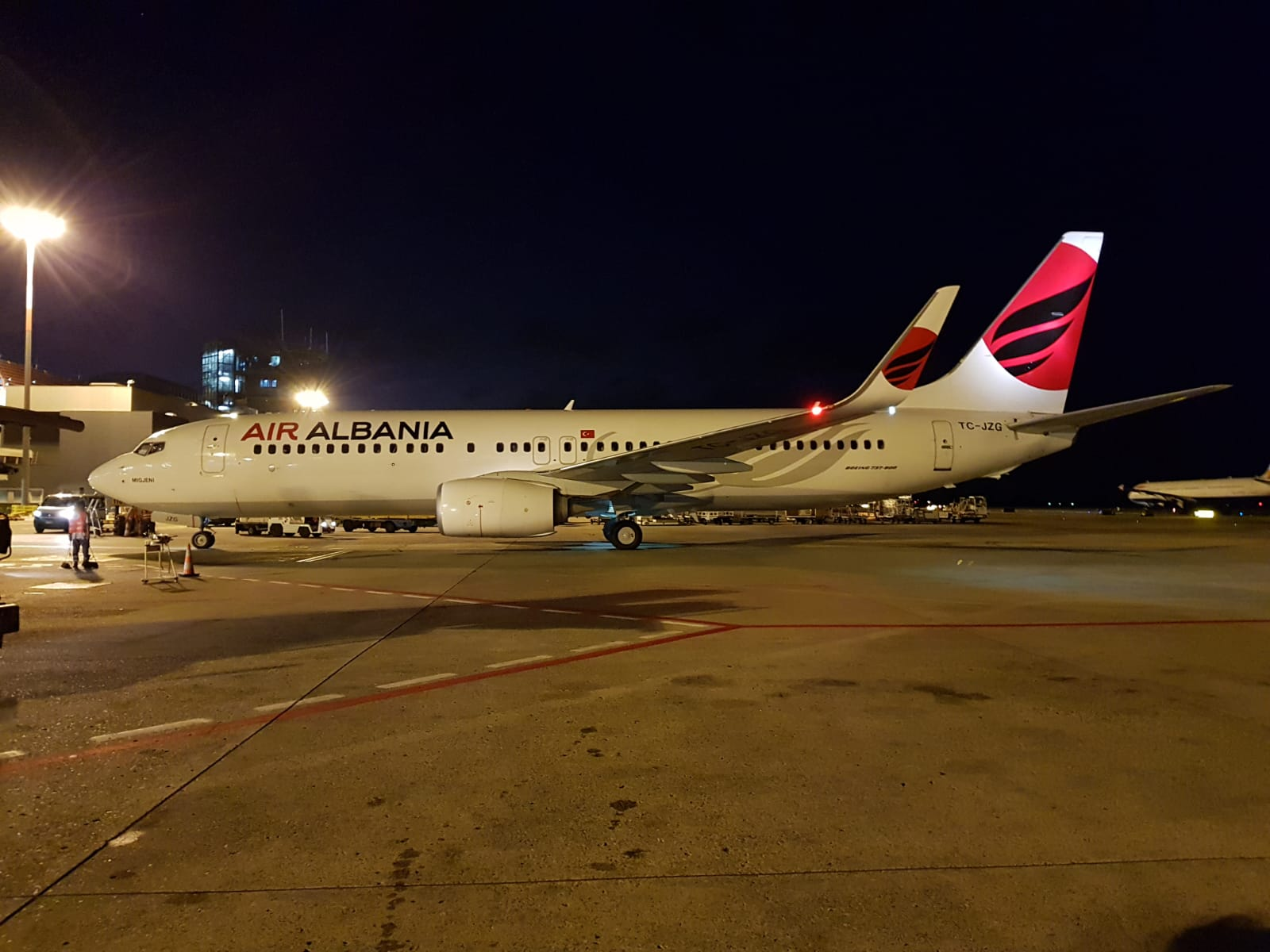
A Boeing 737-800 leased from Turkish Airlines

=== Fleet prior to suspension of operations ===
As of August 2025, prior to the closure of operations, Air Albania operated the following aircraft:

Air Albania fleet
| Aircraft | In service | Orders | Passengers | Notes |
|---|---|---|---|---|
| Airbus A320-200 | 1 | — | 180 | |
| Total | 1 | — | | |

=== Former fleet ===
In the past, Air Albania has operated the following aircraft types:

- Airbus A319-100 (leased from Turkish Airlines)
- Airbus A320-200 (leased from Turkish Airlines)
- Boeing 737-800 (leased from Turkish Airlines & SkyUp Airlines)

=== Aircraft naming ===
The airline named its aircraft after Albanians who have contributed to Albanian culture and society, such as Lasgushi (Airbus A319-100), Migjeni (Airbus A320-200) and Fishta (Airbus A320-200).

== See also ==
- Transport in Albania
- Arena Kombëtare
