= Albtransport =

Albanian flag carrier airline (1957–2004)

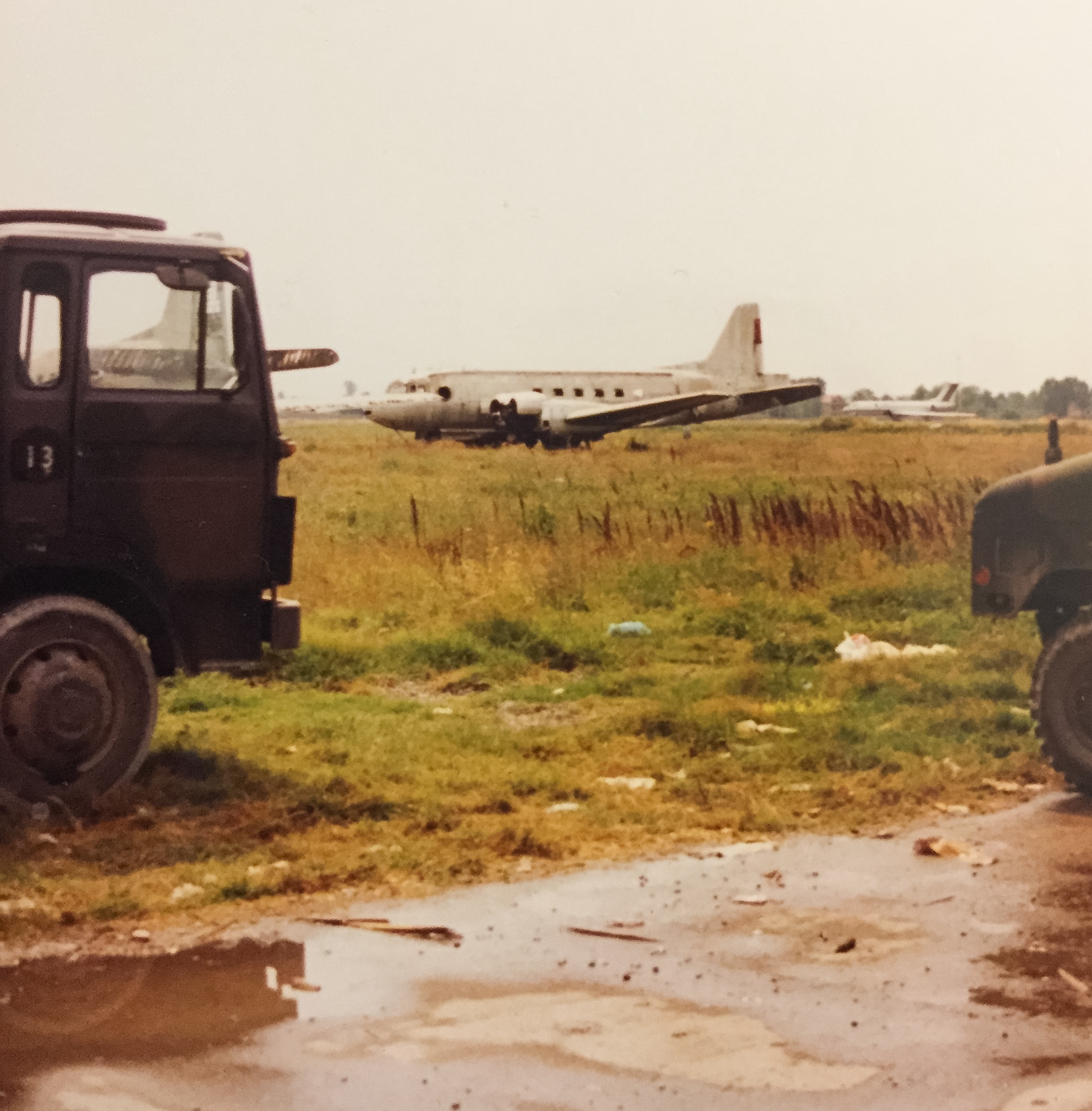
- An Ilyushin 14 abandoned at Tirana Airport in 1999.
- Founded: 25 January 1957
- Commenced operations: 1957
- Ceased operations: 2004
- Hubs: Tirana Airport
- Headquarters: Tirana, Albania

Albtransport was Albania's government-owned agency between 1957 and 1991. Throughout its existence, it only sporadically carried out civil flights with Ilyushin Il-14s of the Albanian Air Force. The agency was primarily responsible for national issues in civil aviation, including air traffic control in Albania and management and handling of Tirana Airport.

== History ==
Albtransport was founded on 25 January 1957 to coincide with the inauguration and opening of Tirana Airport. At the same time, the Albanian government acquired its first commercial-type aircraft, an Ilyushin Il-14, which was used only for government duties. Before that, the country neither had civil aircraft nor met the legal requirements for international scheduled flight operations, because Albania did not join the ICAO until 1989. After Tirana airport opening, foreign airlines, such as Aeroflot, Jat and Malév, flew schedules to Tirana, while Albtransport hardly appeared as an airline. Although the company briefly marketed a connection to Berlin-Schönefeld Airport under its own name in the early 1960s, this route was actually flown in cooperation with East Germany air carrier Interflug, with Albtransport using only residual capacity on board of the Interflug aircraft. The Albanian government aircraft was used only sporadically on national and international special flights, including destinations such as Bucharest, Moscow, Prague and Sofia.

Three other second-hand Ilyushin Il-14s, including one license-built in East Germany and one in Czechoslovakia, were acquired by the Albanian Air Force in 1971. These were also used by Albtransport for ad hoc domestic passenger and cargo flights. In 1991, the agency also briefly operated a Bell 222UT helicopter for the Albanian government. Towards the end of 1991, Albtransport ceased all flight operations, but was not dissolved. At the beginning of 1992, the state-owned agency co-founded Albanian Airlines in the form of a joint venture with the Austrian airline Tyrolean Airways.

After the country's democratization, Albtransport was responsible for civil air traffic control in Albania until the end of 1992 and remained the state operating company of Tirana Airport until the end of 2004.
