= Antea Cement =

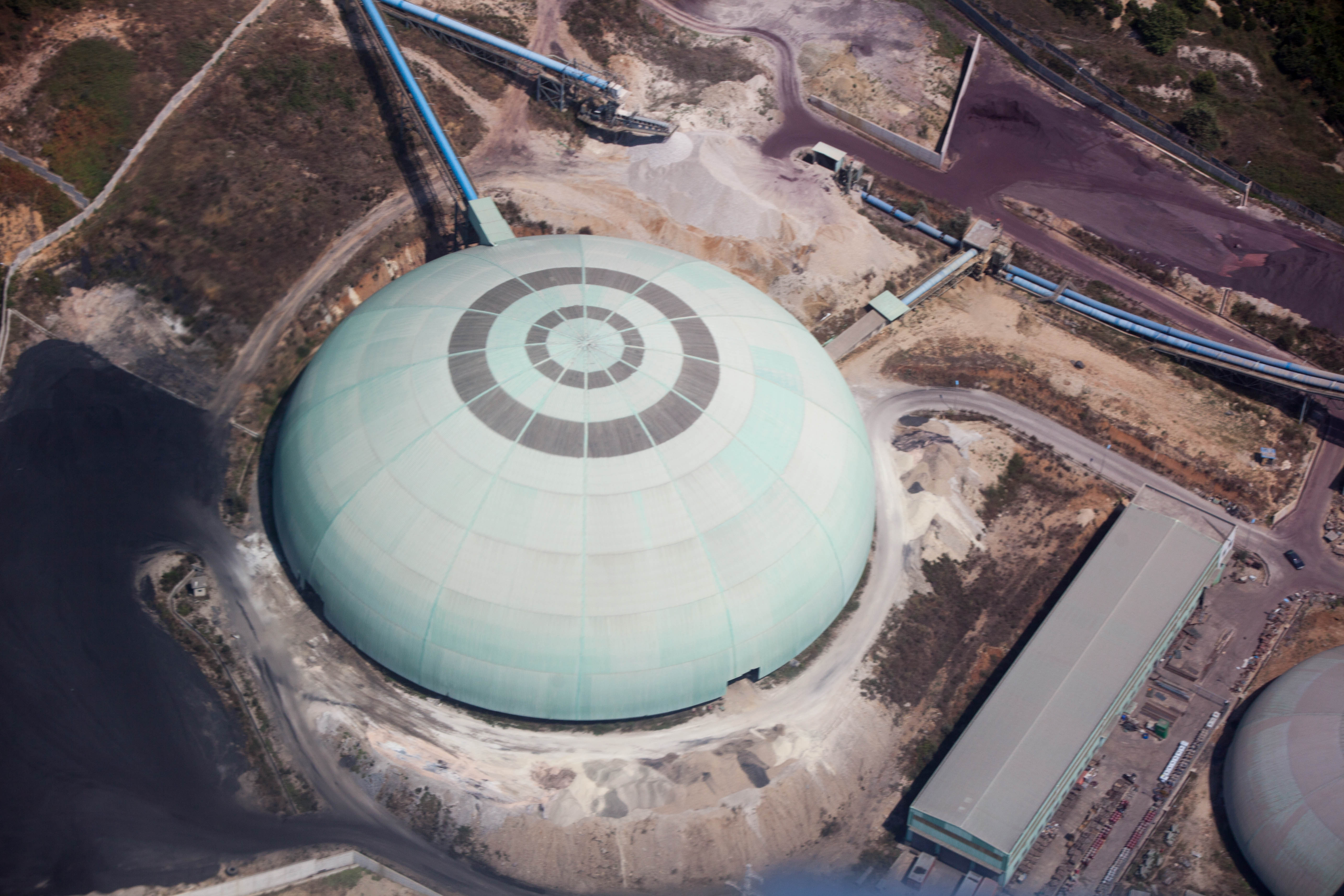
- Industry: Cement and Building materials
- Headquarters: Fushë-Krujë, Albania
- Area served: Europe, America, Africa, Middle East
- Products: Cement construction aggregates ready mix concrete fly ash dry mortars building blocks
- Website: www.anteacement.com

Antea Cement Sh.A. is a cement manufacturing company in Albania.

It is a subsidiary of Titan Cement of Greece. Its cement plant and quarries in Fushë-Krujë are expected to cost 170 million euros (USD233.3 million), according to Reuters. The European Bank for Reconstruction and Development is considering an investment in the project.
