= Albanian Development Bank =

Albanian state-owned development bank

- Banka Shqiptare e Zhvillimit
- Established: 2025
- Type: Development bank
- Headquarters: Tirana, Albania
- Owner: Government of Albania
- Key people: Silvio Pedrazzi
- Website: adb.al

The Albanian Development Bank (Banka Shqiptare e Zhvillimit) is a public development bank in Albania, founded in 2025 and in the process of becoming operational by 2026. The Albanian Ministry of Finance is the main shareholder.

== History ==
In January 2025, the Albanian Government announced the finalization of a draft law on the establishment of the Albanian Development Bank.

In December 2025 the Minister of Economy and Innovation Delina Ibrahimaj announced the registration of the Albanian Development Bank, stating that it is preparing to start its activity in 2026 with support from the Italian counterpart Cassa Depositi e Prestiti.

It is expected that Cassa Depositi e Prestiti will supervise the bank's structure and that thanks to its network of cooperation with international institutions, other development banks will also offer support in regards to risk monitoring, among which, the French Investment Bank.

== Purpose ==
The Albanian Development Bank will be the country's first state-owned development financial institution with 100% public capital. The main objective of the bank is in financing the economy, with a focus on small and medium-sized enterprises (SMEs), as well as the establishment of a postal-banking function and the expansion of access to financial services through the Albanian Post network. The bank also aims to support startup financing, public projects, and the development and modernization of Albania's physical and digital infrastructure, while complementing commercial bank financing.

== See also ==
- List of banks in Albania
- List of national development banks
