= Union Bank (Albania) =

Private bank in Albania

- Company type: Private
- Industry: Banking
- Founded: 2006
- Headquarters: Tirana, Albania
- Number of locations: 34 (2024)
- Products: Banking services
- Number of employees: 519 (2024)
- Website: www.unionbank.al

Union Bank was established in Albania on January 11, 2006, as the second bank with Albanian capital. The head office is located in Tirana.

In 2017 it employed 349 people and had 31 branches throughout Albania. In 2021, Union Bank had a market share of 4.53%, making it the 8th largest bank in Albania.

== History ==
Union Bank was founded in 2005 by the Union Financiar Tirane (Financial Union of Tirana - UFT). The initial capital was €17.6 million and the bank had 7 branches in Tirana, Durrës, Elbasan, Fushë Krujë and Fier.

In 2008 the EBRD bought 12.5% of the shares, becoming the 2nd largest shareholder, while the other 87.5% is owned by the Albanian shareholders In 2008 the Bank's total assets exceeded €100 million. In the following years, the total assets further increased, reaching the amount of €256 million in 2014.

The Bank's main strategy is to further expand its network and increase its lending activities, with particular focus on the SME sector. The EBRD helps Union Bank, by developing and financing its portfolio and strengthening the bank's funding base.

== Mergers and acquisitions ==
=== LandesLease acquisition ===
In November 2014 Union Bank announced the acquisition of 100% of the shares of the local leasing company LandesLease. LandesLease has operated in the Albanian financial market since 2005, and since 2014 has acted as a subsidiary of Union Bank. The acquisition was made from Emerging Europe Leasing Finance who at the time owned 72% stake in the company, the rest owned by local investors. In 2014, LandesLease had 15% market share in the Albanian leasing market, financing more than 350 cars, and annual revenues of €1.8 million.

=== International Commercial Bank (ICB) acquisition ===
In November 2018 Union Bank, Albania's eighth-biggest bank, bought International Commercial Bank (ICB), a smaller Malaysian-owned bank. This acquisition followed a trend of consolidation in the Albanian banking system, as the number of commercial banks had been brought down to 13 from 16 the previous year. Founded in January 1997 International Commercial Bank (ICB) consists of assets worth $96.6 million and employs over 90 people as of 2018. After the acquisition, Union Bank had assets of over $560 million and around 4.5% market share.
