= Bus lines in Tirana =

Albanian bus routes

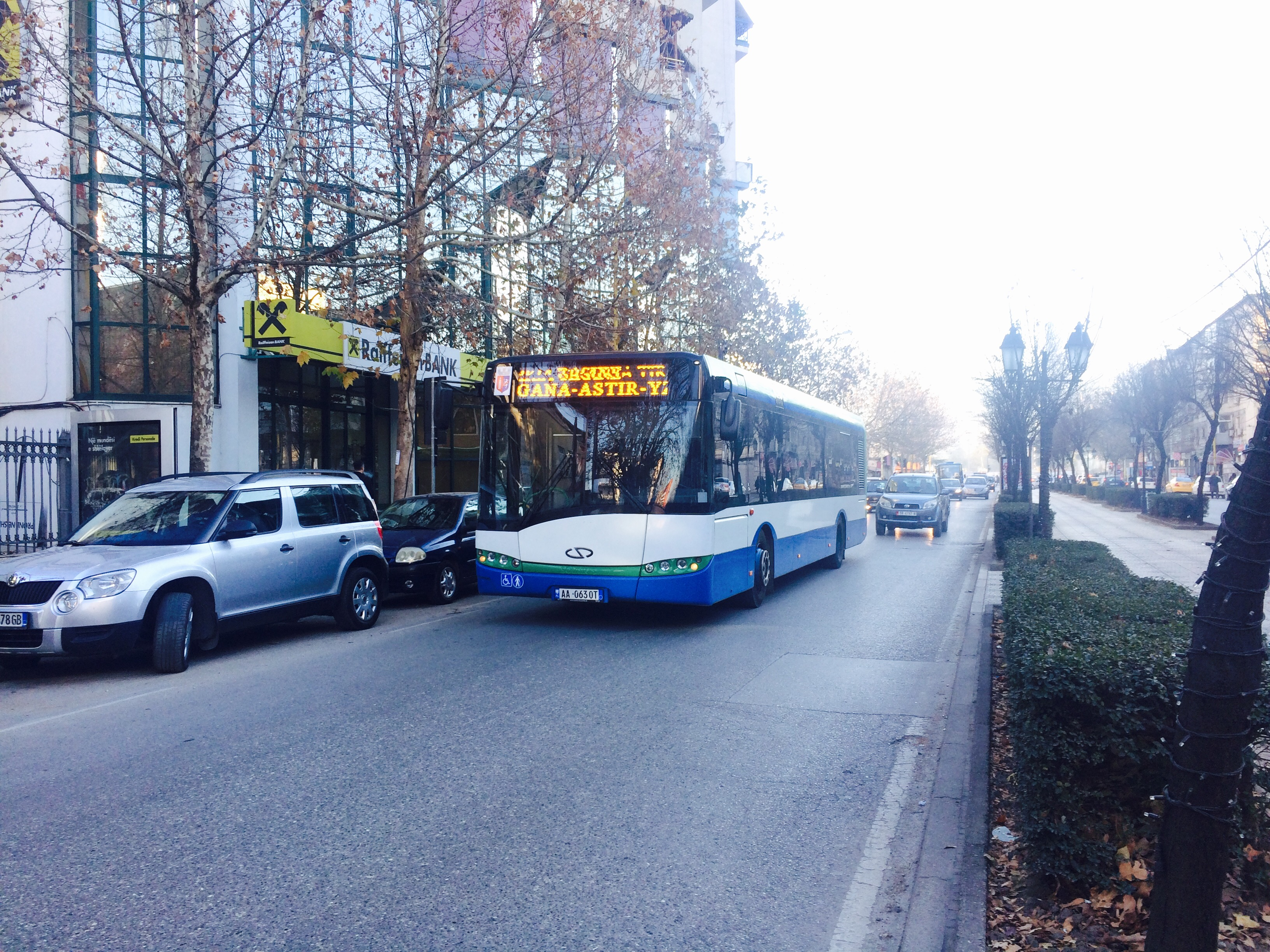

The Bus lines in Tirana (Albanian: Linjat e autobusëve në Tiranë) refer to the bus lines operated by both private and public companies in Tirana, Albania. Despite the introduction of relatively new buses, passengers experience overcrowding and intermittent use of air conditioning on board.

== Lines ==
The Following lines run through Tirana. Some start at the city center near Skanderbeg Square (hence the name "Qender", meaning "Centre") or near the Clock Tower of Tirana.

- L.1A Allias-Selite
- L.1B Allias-Kodra e Diellit
- L.2 Ish Stacioni I trenit-Terminali Juglindor/TEG
- L.3A Kashar-Qender Orar
- L.3B Kashar-Qender Antiorar
- L.3C Yrshek-Qender
- L.4 CityPark-Megatek-QTU-Qender
- L.5A Shkoze-Qender
- L.5B Institut-Qender
- L.6 Laprake Qender
- L.8A Qender-Sauk-Terminali Juglindor/TEG
- L.8B Qender-Sanatoriumi
- L.8C Qender-Sauk i Vjeter
- L.9A Qyteti Studenti-Jordan Misja
- L.9B Vilat Gjermane-Jordan Misja
- L.10A Çollak-Qender
- L.10B Qender-Mihal Grameno
- L.10C Ura e Shkozes-Ish Fusha e Aviacionit
- L.11 Porcelan-Qender
- L.12 Tregu Dinamo-Sharre
- L.13A Tirana E Re Orar
- L.13B Tirana e Re Antiorar
- L.15A Kombinat-Kinostudio
- L.15B Kombinat-Tufine
- L.16A Unaza Orar (Green Line)
- L.16B Unaza Antiorar (Green Line)

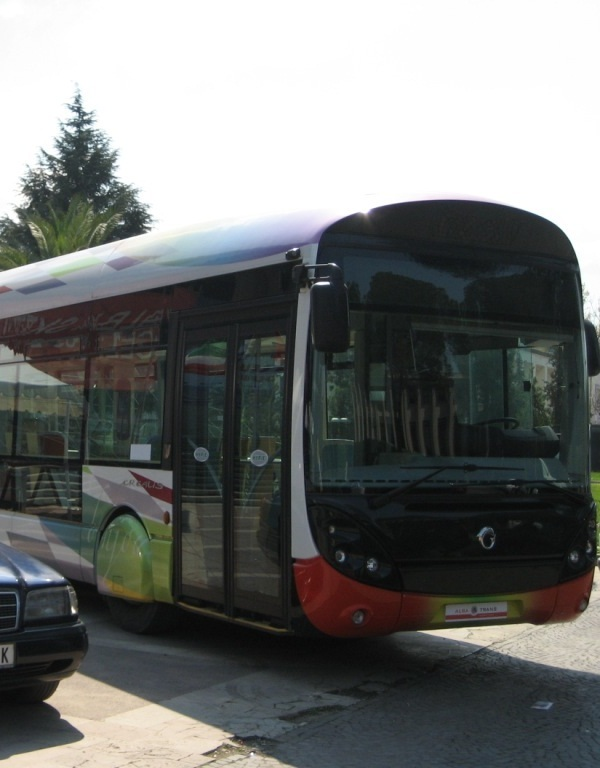
There are also Rare and Modern Buses in Tirana.This is a Irisbus Crealis !

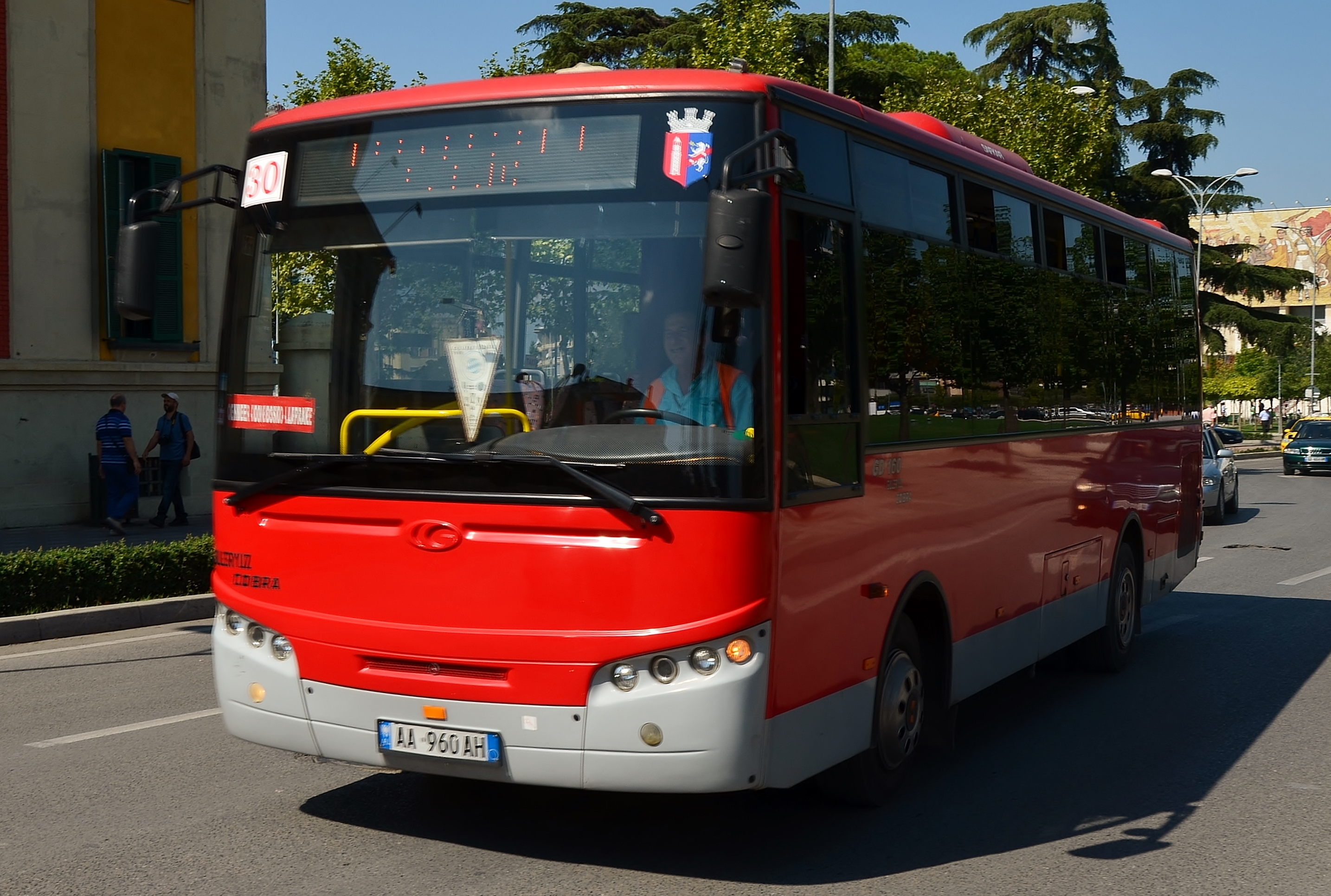
Smaller buses serving rural Tirana

City buses cost 40 Lek, this includes the tax of the Ministry of Finance. The Vorë bus is 50 Lek.

In addition, there are several bus lines linking Tirana to several shopping centers:

- L.4 (CityPark-Megatek-QTU
- L.10C & L.5A (Toptani Shopping Center-ETC)
- L.5B & L.4 & L.13 (Casa Italia)
- L.2 & L.8A (TEG)

Further, there exists a line serving Tirana International Airport from and to Skanderbeg Square:

- Rinas Express

=== Intercity and International Buses and Minibuses ===
In anticipation of the construction of the two new multi-modal bus terminals near Kamza Overpass on the western entrance of Tirana, and near TEG Shopping Center in southeastern Tirana, inter-city lines depart from different locations around Tirana as follows:

- Northern and Southern Albania including Durres lines: Kamza Overpass (Kthesa e Kamzes) on the grounds of the future Tirana Multimodal Bus Terminal
- Southeastern Albania lines: Teminali Lindor near "TEG"
- Kosovo and International lines: Ex-Eagle Square & Terminali Lindor!
