= Albawings =

Albanian low-cost airline

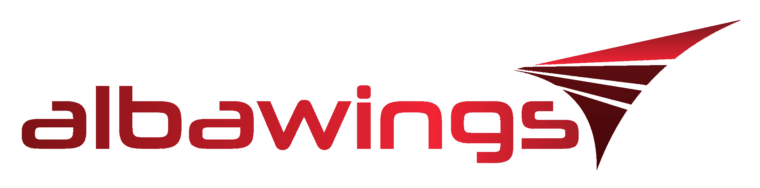

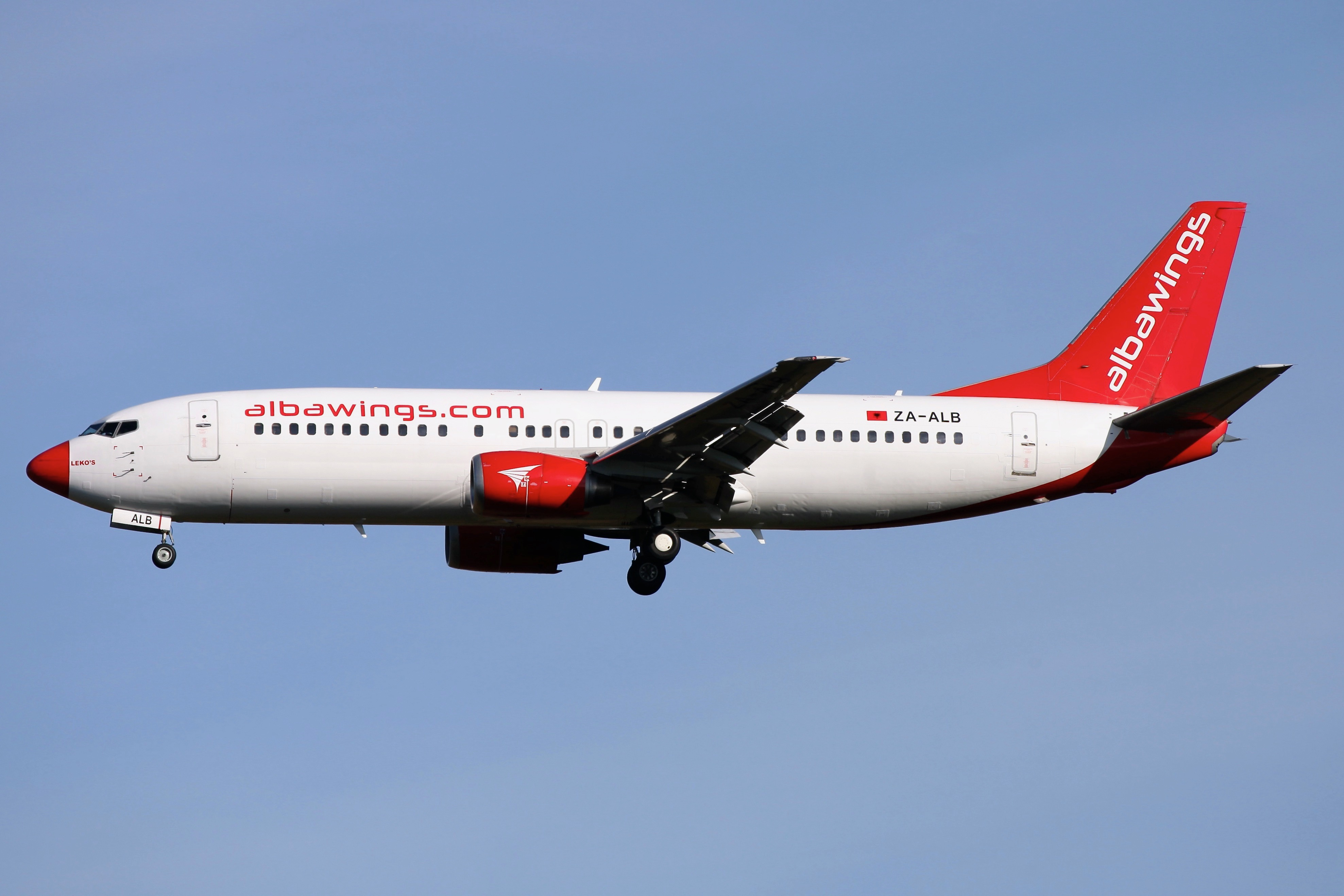
- Boeing 737-400
IATA	ICAO	Call sign
2B	AWT	ALBAWINGS
- Founded: February 2015
- Commenced operations: September 2016
- Ceased operations: January 12, 2024
- Fleet size: 1
- Destinations: 7
- Headquarters: Tirana, Albania
- Key people: Dritan Shakohoxha CEO
- Employees: 72
- Website: www.albawings.com/en

Albawings was an Albanian low-cost airline headquartered in Tirana and based at Tirana International Airport Nënë Tereza.

== History ==
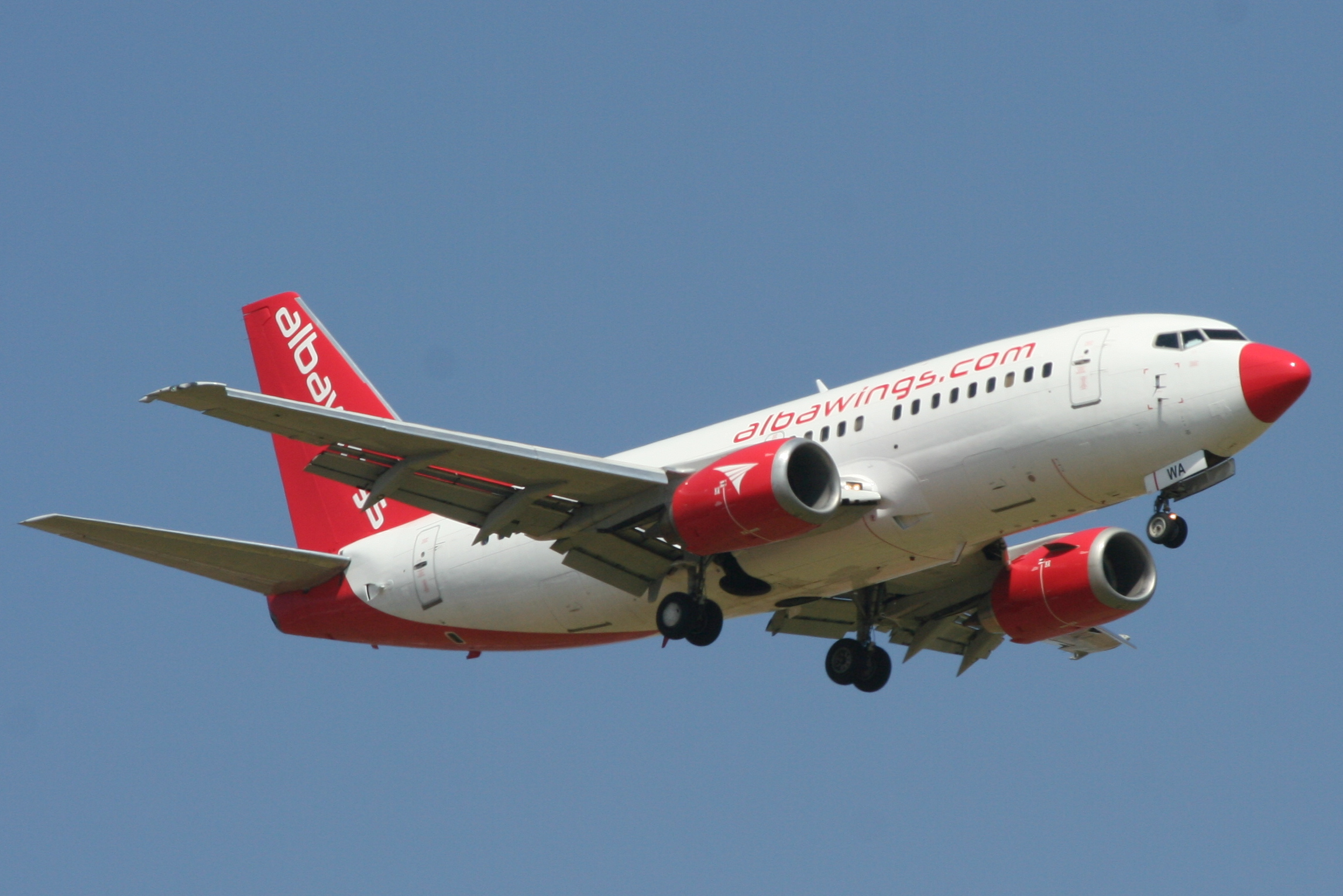
Boeing 737-500

Albawings was founded in February 2015. AThe air carrier was awarded the Air Operator's Certificate (AOC) by the Albanian Civil Aviation Authority on 4 February 2016. The first aircraft of the company was a Boeing 737-500, with which Albawings started operations, was christened "Spirit of Tirana".

On 11 December 2016, a second aircraft was delivered by rock band frontman Bruce Dickinson. The leased plane was a Boeing 737-400 owned by Cardiff Aviation, and was christened Mr. Pitkin after Sir Norman Wisdom's character Norman Piktin. Wisdom was a notably popular actor in Albania during the communist years of Enver Hoxha, when the character was commonly referred to as "Mr. Pitkin" by Albanian audiences.

On 12 January 2024, Albawings stopped flying and ceased operations due to strong competition from other carriers.

== Fleet ==
As of August 2025, Albawings operates the following aircraft:

Albawings fleet
Aircraft	In Service	Orders	Passengers			Notes
Aircraft	In Service	Orders	C	Y	Total	Notes
Boeing 737-400	1			188	188	
Total	1					

Albawings former fleet
Aircraft	total	Introduced	Retired	Note
Boeing 737-500	1	2016	2020	stored in a hangar
Boeing 737-400	3	2016	2017	leased from VVB Aviation Malta
