= Ferlut =

Company in Albania

Felut SH. a. logo

Ferlut SH. a. is a company based in Tirana, Albania. It operates the Unaza busline in Tirana. It has a workforce of 300.
