= Albcontrol =

Albanian company

- Founded: 1992
- Headquarters: Tirana, Albania
- Parent: Ministry of Infrastructure and Energy
- Website: www.albcontrol.al

Albcontrol is a 100% joint stock Albanian company owned by the Ministry of Infrastructure and Energy. It was established as a state-owned enterprise in 1992 and on February 3, 1999, it transformed into a joint stock company called the "National Air Traffic Agency". Albcontrol manages and controls the Albanian airspace (FIR), in compliance with international air navigation standards. It is a member of Eurocontrol since 2003. In 2009 it joined CANSO Global and in January 2016 it became a full member of CANSO Europe Region.

== See also ==
- Civil Aviation Authority (Albania)
