= Albanian-American Enterprise Fund =

Nonprofit organization

- Company type: Investment fund
- Founded: 1995
- Headquarters: Tirana, Albania
- Key people: Michael Granoff (chairman of the board)
- Total assets: ▲US$178 million
- Website: www.aaef.com

Albanian-American Enterprise Fund (AAEF) is a non-political, not-for-profit US corporation established pursuant to the Support for East European Democracy Act of 1989 (“SEED Act”). It was incorporated in 1995 and maintains offices in New York City and Tirana. It is located in "Ibrahim Rugova" str, “Green Park” Complex, Tower 2, 12th Floor, Postal Code 1019, Tirana, Albania.

== Background ==
The AAEF was established as part of a United States initiative to promote the private sector development in formerly Communist countries in Europe and Central Asia. It invests solely in Albania. To accomplish its mission, the AAEF invests and lends in a wide array of private enterprises, disseminates western business know-how, and, when appropriate, proposes changes to government policies affecting business. In addition, AAEF provides its portfolio investments with training to establish best business practices that incorporate acceptable financial reporting standards, as well as guidance in enhancing management capabilities and recruiting skilled personnel. The AAEF also provides its portfolio investments with corporate finance and strategic planning advice.

The United States Government provided AAEF's initial capital through a grant from the United States Agency for International Development. The original Board members were appointed by the President of the United States. The AAEF operates independently from the U.S. Government, and is managed by professional investment managers under the guidance of the Board of Directors.

== Activities ==
Although incorporated as a not-for-profit organization, the AAEF is managed as a private investment fund to maximize risk-adjusted returns. Investments can include loans, leases, guarantees, and equity ownership. Profits generated from AAEF investments are reinvested in new projects in Albania. In addition to recycling its profits to promote private enterprise creation and expansion, it is the AAEF's intent to demonstrate to other potential investors that investment in Albania can be successful and profitable. The AAEF strives to be a catalyst for additional private investment in Albania.

The AAEF endeavors to identify and invest in enterprises that have good prospects of being commercially viable and are filling an under-served sector of the Albanian economy. Such investments should be capable of meeting international standards of “best business practices”, promote local manufacturing, create jobs and exports, and be environmentally safe.

Since its inception the AAEF has invested in or lent to over 40 Albanian companies. As of September 30, 2008, net assets of the AAEF amounted to $178 million or 6 times the original capital. Companies financed by AAEF have contributed more than $1 billion to the country's GDP and created more than 5,000 jobs.

Among the AAEF's notable investments are the modernizing of Tirana International Airport "Mother Teresa" and establishing the American Bank of Albania (ABA). In 2009, the AAEF created its legacy organization The Albanian – American Development Foundation (AADF) The AADF's mission is to facilitate the development of a sustainable private sector economy and a democratic society in Albania, and to contribute to stability in Southeastern Europe.
