= Tafa Air =

Albanian airline project (2009–2010)

IATA	ICAO	Call sign
-	-	-
- Founded: May 2009
- Commenced operations: 18 December 2009
- Ceased operations: February 2010
- Operating bases: Tirana International Airport
- Fleet size: 1
- Headquarters: Tirana, Albania
- Key people: Taf Tafa (Founder & CEO)

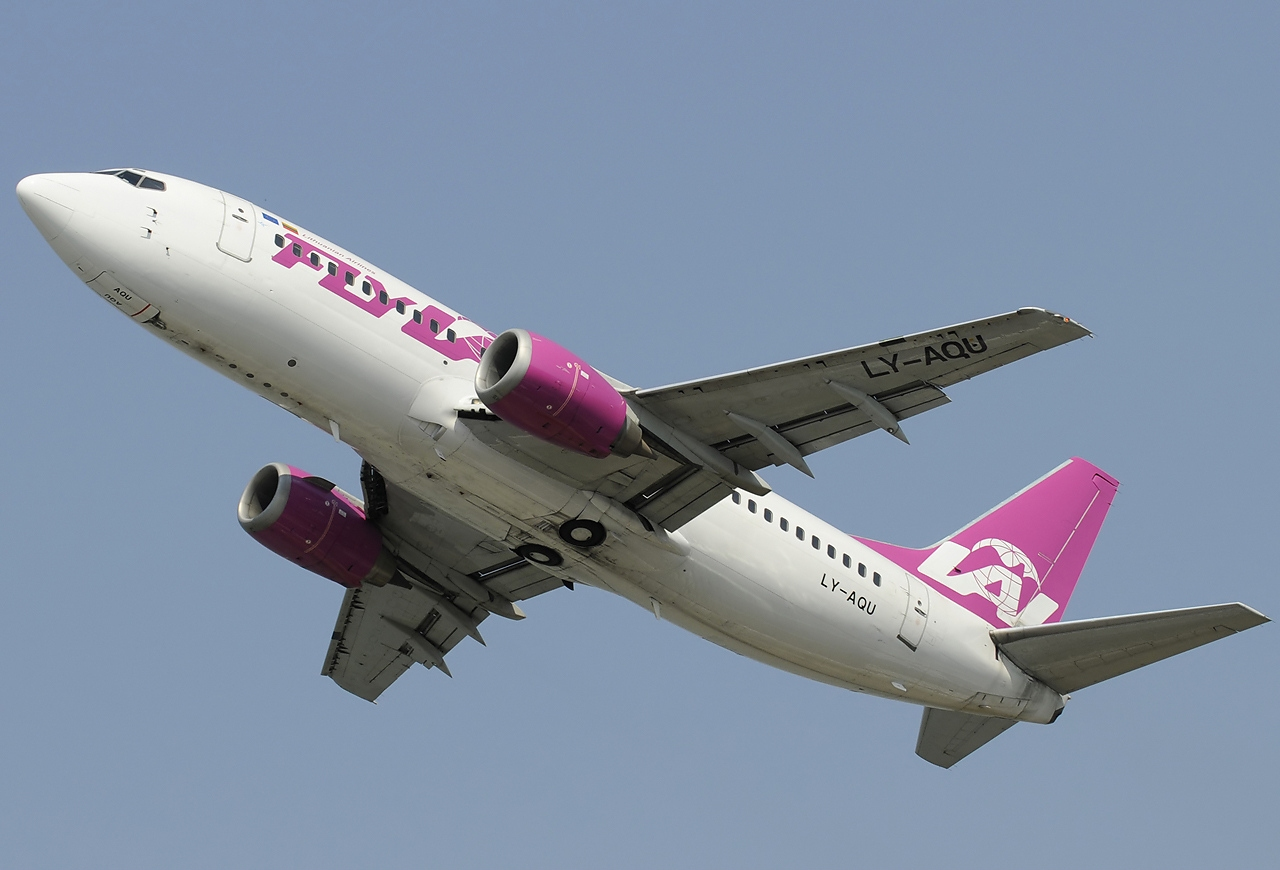
Boeing 737-322 operated by flyLAL Charters on Tafa Air behalf.

Tafa Air was a short-lived low-cost airline based in Tirana, Albania, intended for Albanians living abroad (mostly in Germany). The airline was set up by Albanian businessman Taf Tafa and was supported by Albanian and Kosovan shareholders. Services started on 18 December 2009, with scheduled flights from Tirana International Airport and Pristina International Airport to Athens International Airport.

In early February 2010, Tafa Air was forced to suspend operations as Lithuanian airline flyLAL Charters discontinued the lease contract that provided Tafa Air with its single aircraft. Tafa announced it would restart services in late March or early April of the same year, but the company has dissolved since then.

== Fleet ==
Tafa Air operated its flights using a leased Boeing 737-300.

Tafa Air former fleet
Aircraft	Total	Orders	Passengers			Notes
Aircraft	Total	Orders	C	Y	Total	Notes
Boeing 737-300	1	—	—	149	149	
Total	1				149	

== See also ==
- List of defunct airlines of Albania
