= Kashar =

- Administrative unit
- Location within Albania
- Coordinates: 41°20′54″N 19°43′04″E
- Country: Albania
- County: Tirana
- Municipality: Tirana
  - Administrative unit: 37.34 km^{2} (14.42 sq mi)

Population (2023)
  - Administrative unit: 89,395
  - Administrative unit density: 2,394/km^{2} (6,201/sq mi)
- Time zone: UTC+1 (CET)
  - Summer (DST): UTC+2 (CEST)
- Postal Code: 1051
- Area Code: (0)48

Kashar is a village and former municipality in Tirana County, central Albania. Its population as of the 2023 census was 89,395, making it the 3rd most populated municipal unit in the country.

== History ==
The village was first attested in 1456 as the battlefield between the League of Lezhë and the Ottoman Empire.

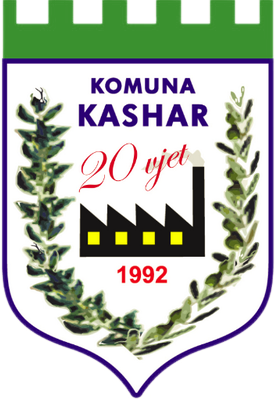
Coat of arms of the former municipality

In the 2015 local government reform, it became a subdivision of the municipality Tirana.

== Demographics ==
Historical population
Year	Pop.	±%
1989	10,969	—
2001	17,382	+58.5%
2011	43,353	+149.4%
2023	89,395	+106.2%

Kashar consists of ten communities with a total population of almost 90,000.

== Economy ==
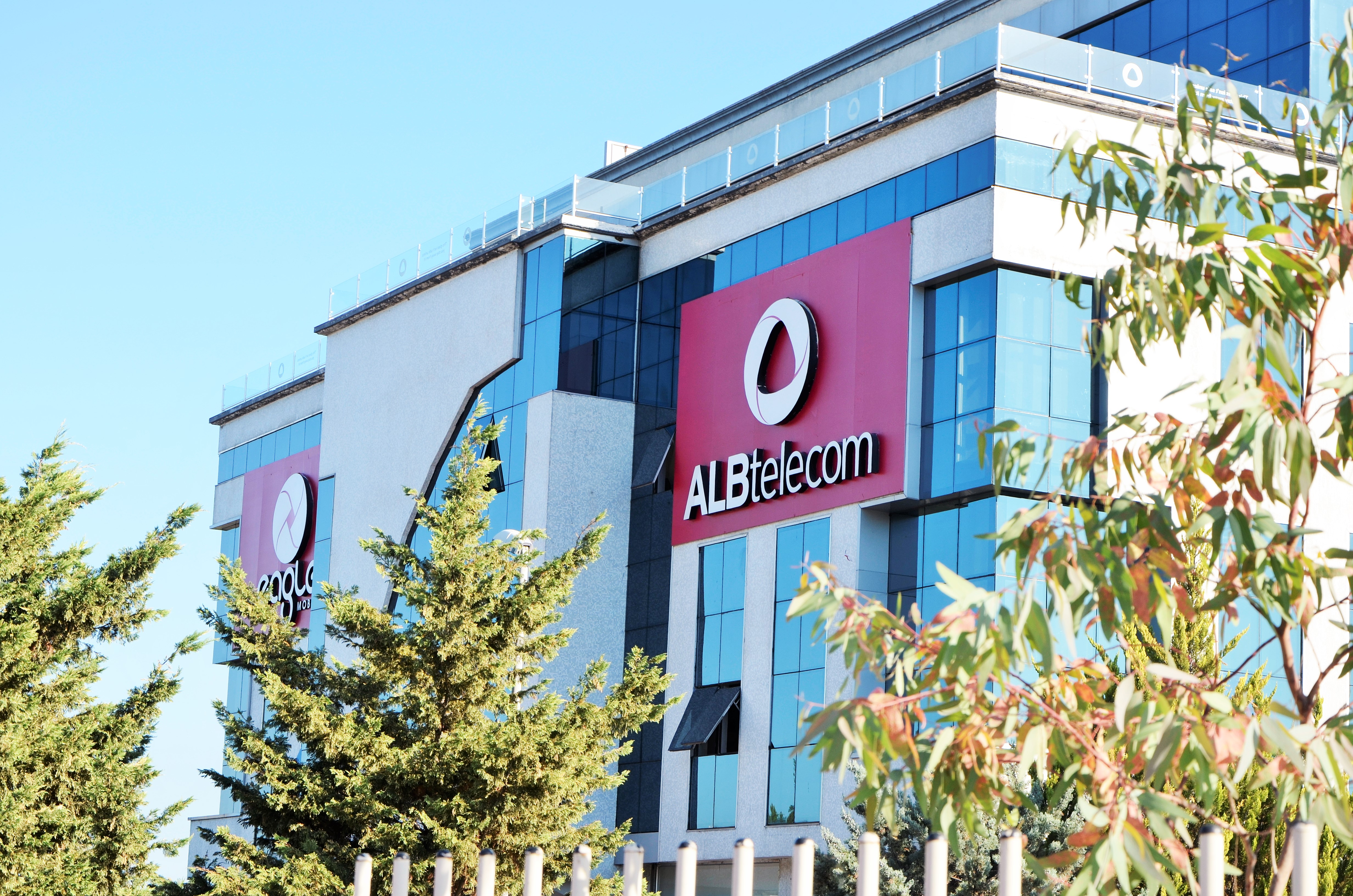
ALBtelecom Headquarters

Kashar is the industrial hub of Tirana with many large companies located there. The biggest Albanian company that is located there is ALBtelecom, a privately owned company that offers telecommunication services. There is also the Coca-Cola Bottling Shqipëria. Kashar's economy also relies on agriculture and housing due to a huge influx of people coming to Tirana. Kashar hosts one of Tirana's main parks, Kashar Park, around the Kus village reservoir and the television station Top Channel. Additionally, Kashar is home to Timak, an Albanian manufacturer of ambulances, trailers, and military vehicles.

== International relations ==
Kashar is twinned with:

- Sindos, Thessaloniki regional unit, Greece
