= Intesa Sanpaolo Bank (Albania) =

Bank of Albania

- Company type: Private
- Industry: Banking
- Founded: 2008; 17 years ago

Intesa Sanpaolo Bank Albania was created in 2008 from the merger of two of the country's most important banks: Banca Italo-Albanese (founded in 1993) and the American Bank of Albania (founded in 1998), both acquired by Intesa Sanpaolo Group.

In 2021, Intesa Sanpaolo Bank Albania had a market share of 11.01%, making it the 4th largest bank in Albania.

== History ==
=== American Bank of Albania ===
ABA was established in September 1998, by the Albanian-American Enterprise Fund (AAEF) a private investment fund established by the United States government under the SEED Act of 1989, to assist Albania in its transition to a market economy. As at 30 December 2007, ABA had total deposits of LEK 93.4 billion, total loans of over LEK 39.7 billion, and total assets of over LEK 106.4 billion. On the 20th and 21 December 2006, AAEF, ABA’s sole shareholder, signed a Share Purchase Agreement and a Shareholder Agreement for the sale of 80% stake of the shares outstanding, with AAEF maintaining control of the other 20% stake, until 2009. The agreement was finalized on 29 June 2007, when ABA officially became a bank of Intesa Sanpaolo Group.

=== Banca Italo-Albanese ===
Banca Italo-Albanese was established in July 1993 as one of the first private banks in Albania. It was established as a joint venture between the National Commercial Bank of Albania (shares were transferred to Ministry of Finance) and the Italian Banca di Roma. On 7 December 2005, Sanpaolo IMI signed the agreement for the acquisition of a stake of 80% in Banca Italo Albanese, from Capitalia and the Ministry of Finance (40% each). The European Bank for Reconstruction and Development (20%) retained its stake.
