= Ada Air =

1991–2007 airline in Albania

IATA	ICAO	Call sign
ZY	ADE	ADA AIR
- Founded: 1991
- Ceased operations: 2007
- Hubs: Tirana International Airport Nënë Tereza
- Fleet size: 1
- Destinations: 2
- Headquarters: Tirana, Albania
- Key people: Marsel Skëndo
- Website: www.adaair.com

Ada Air Sh.p.k was a regional airline based in Tirana, Albania, which operated from 1991 to 2007. It operated scheduled services from Albania to Bari, Italy, and overnight freight services for DHL. Its main base was Tirana International Airport Nënë Tereza.

== History ==
The airline was established in 1991 and started operations on February 3, 1992. It started scheduled flights to Bari on February 5, 1992, and was accepted by the IATA on May 25, 1992. It has operated flights to Greece, Italy, Kosovo and the Republic of Macedonia and charter services throughout the Balkans and Europe. The airline was owned by Julien Roche (50%), vice-president and founder, and Marsel Skendo (50%), president and founder of Ada Air.

== Destinations ==
Ada Air operated the following international scheduled service (at March 2007):

- Albania
  - Tirana (Tirana International Airport)
- Italy
  - Bari (Bari International Airport)

== Fleet ==
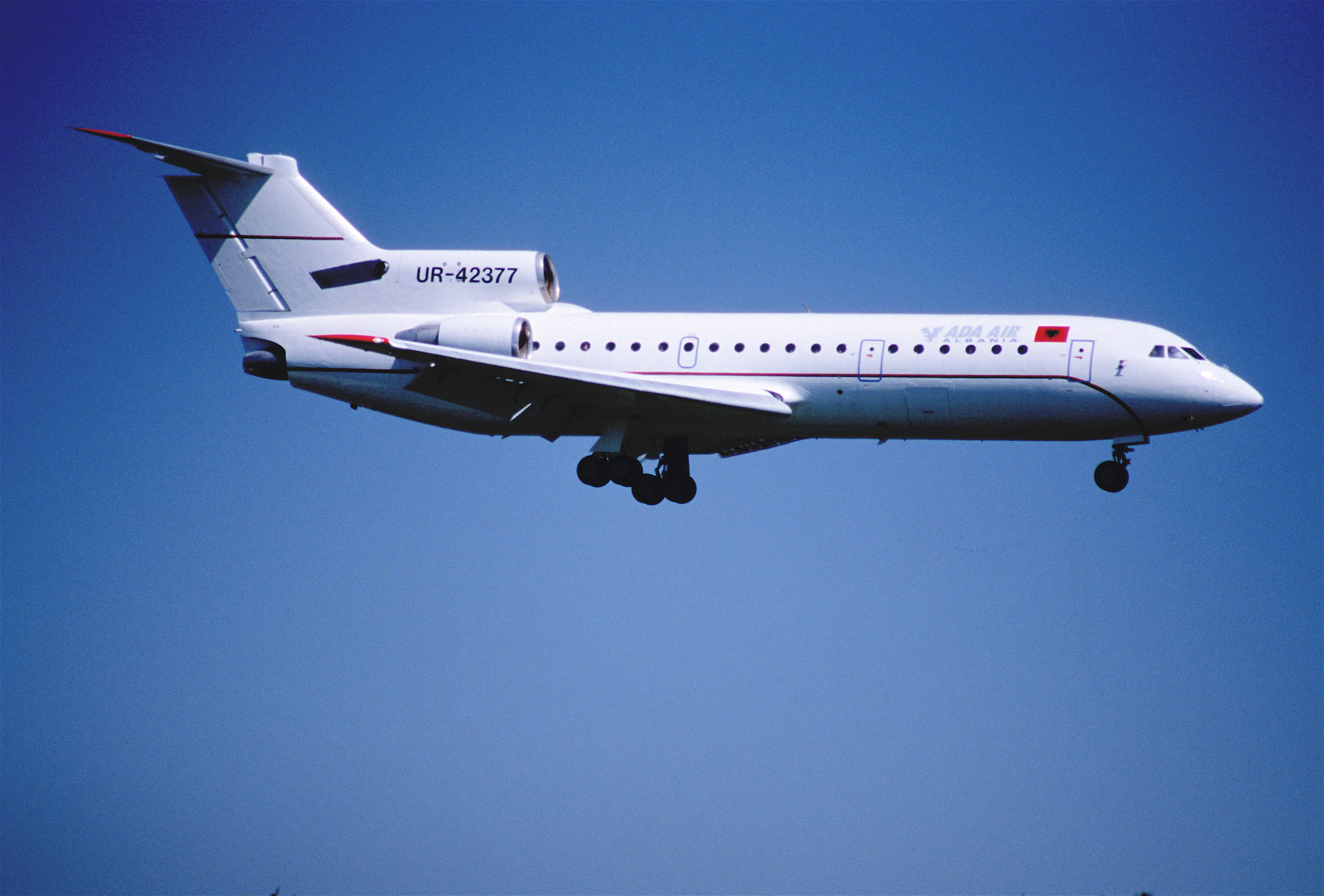
Ada Air Yakovlev 42 Mid-Air

As of March 2009 the ADA Air fleet included:

- 1 Embraer EMB 110P2 Bandeirante

Previously operated:

- 1 Fokker 100 (leased from Montenegro Airlines, with Montenegrin crews)
- 1 Yakovlev Yak-40

== See also ==
- List of defunct airlines of Albania
