= Star Airways =

Albanian airline

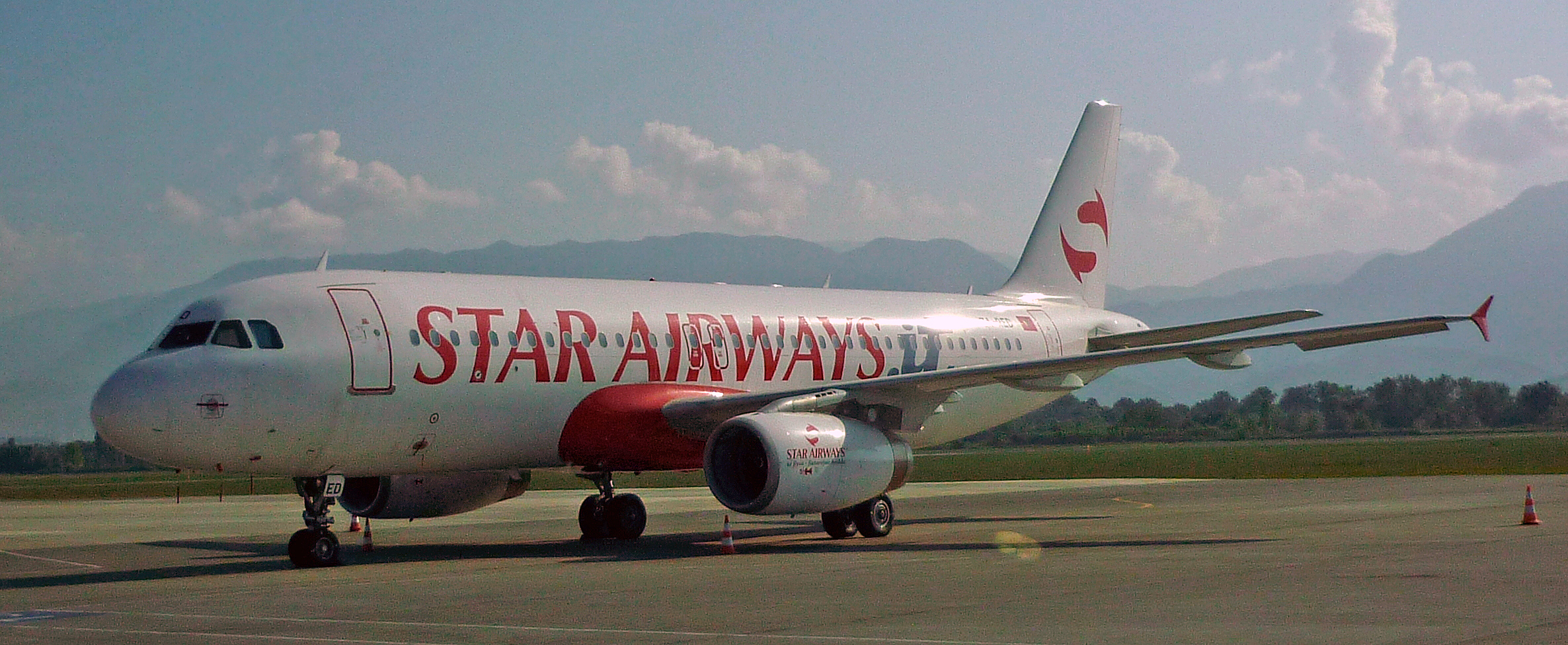
- Airbus A320
IATA	ICAO	Call sign
4S	STB	—
- Founded: 2008
- Ceased operations: 2010
- Hubs: Tirana International Airport Nënë Tereza, Albania
- Fleet size: 4
- Destinations: 4
- Headquarters: Tirana, Albania

Star Airways was an airline based in Tirana, Albania. It was founded by several Albanian and Italian investors in 2008, and obtained its operating license in June 2009. On 3 April 2010, Star Airways received its first aircraft, an Airbus A320. Its second A320 arrived in May of the same year.

== History ==
Star Airways was founded by several Albanian and Italian investors and received its operating license in June 2009. On 3 April 2010, Star Airways received its first aircraft, an Airbus A320-231 registered ZA-RED and previously operated by the Mexican airline Mexicana de Aviación. The second aircraft, an Airbus A320-211 previously operated by Nouvelair, arrived in May of the same year. Both aircraft were obtaine through the leasing company ILFC.

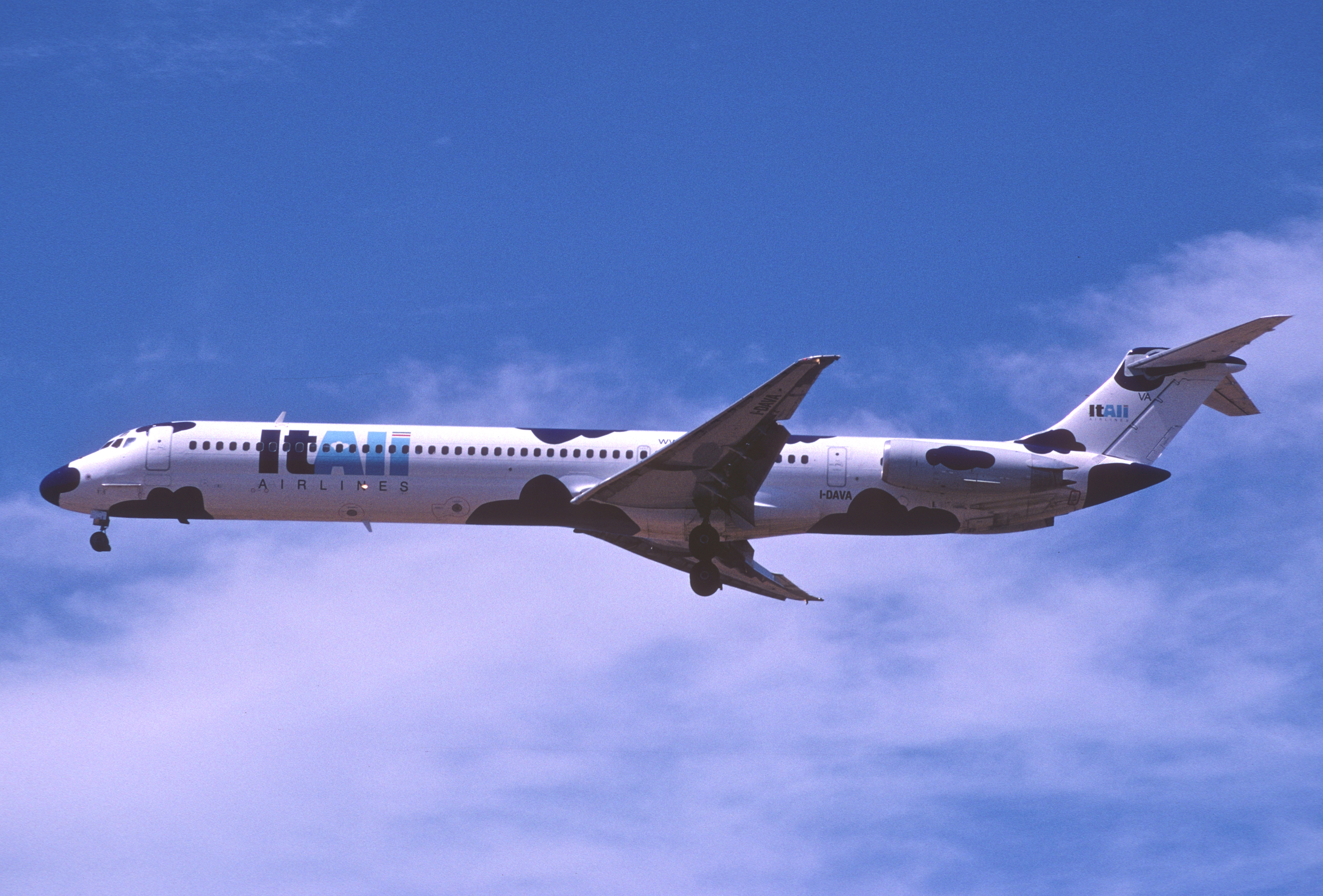
One of the MD-82s supplied by ItAli Airlines

On 7 June 2010, Star Airways commenced operations with two McDonnell Douglas MD-82 jetliners supplied by ItAli Airlines as the Albanian air carrier had not received approval to operate with its own aircraft. Starting with scheduled flights from Tirana to several Italian cities, there were plans to expand routes to other cities such as Istanbul, Antalya, Thessaloniki and Düsseldorf. However, in the summer of 2010, the Albanian aviation authority withdrew the operating license and all flight operations were stopped completely in the following month of September.

== Fleet ==
- 2 Airbus A320 never operated
- 2 McDonnell Douglas MD-82 operated by ItAli Airlines

Star Airways fleet
Aircraft	Total	Orders	Passengers			Notes
Aircraft	Total	Orders	C	Y	Total	Notes
Airbus A320	2	—	—	195	195	
McDonnell Douglas MD-82	2	—	—	130	130	
Total	0	0				

== See also ==
- List of defunct airlines of Albania
