= Fushë-Krujë =

- Administrative unit
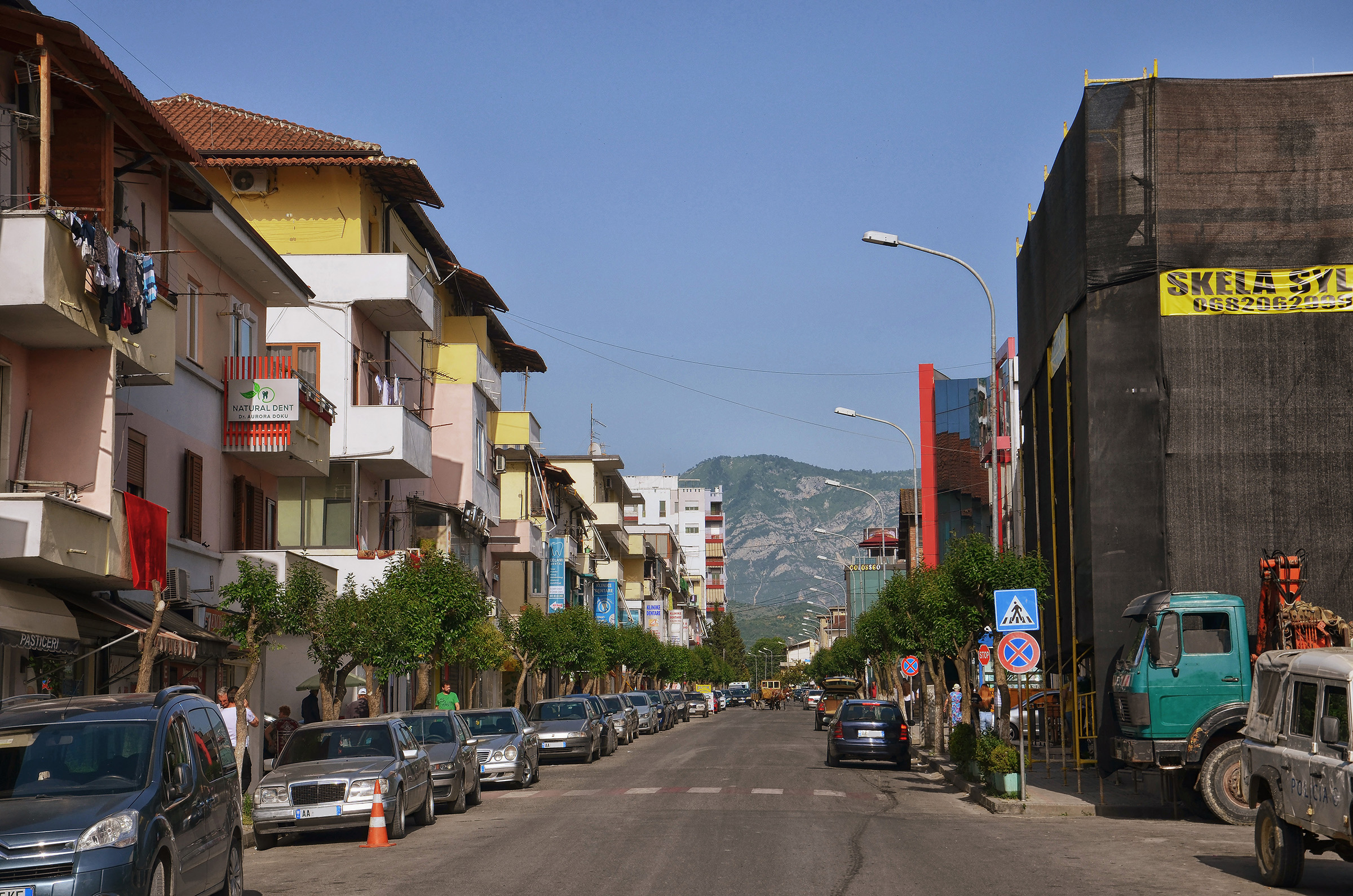
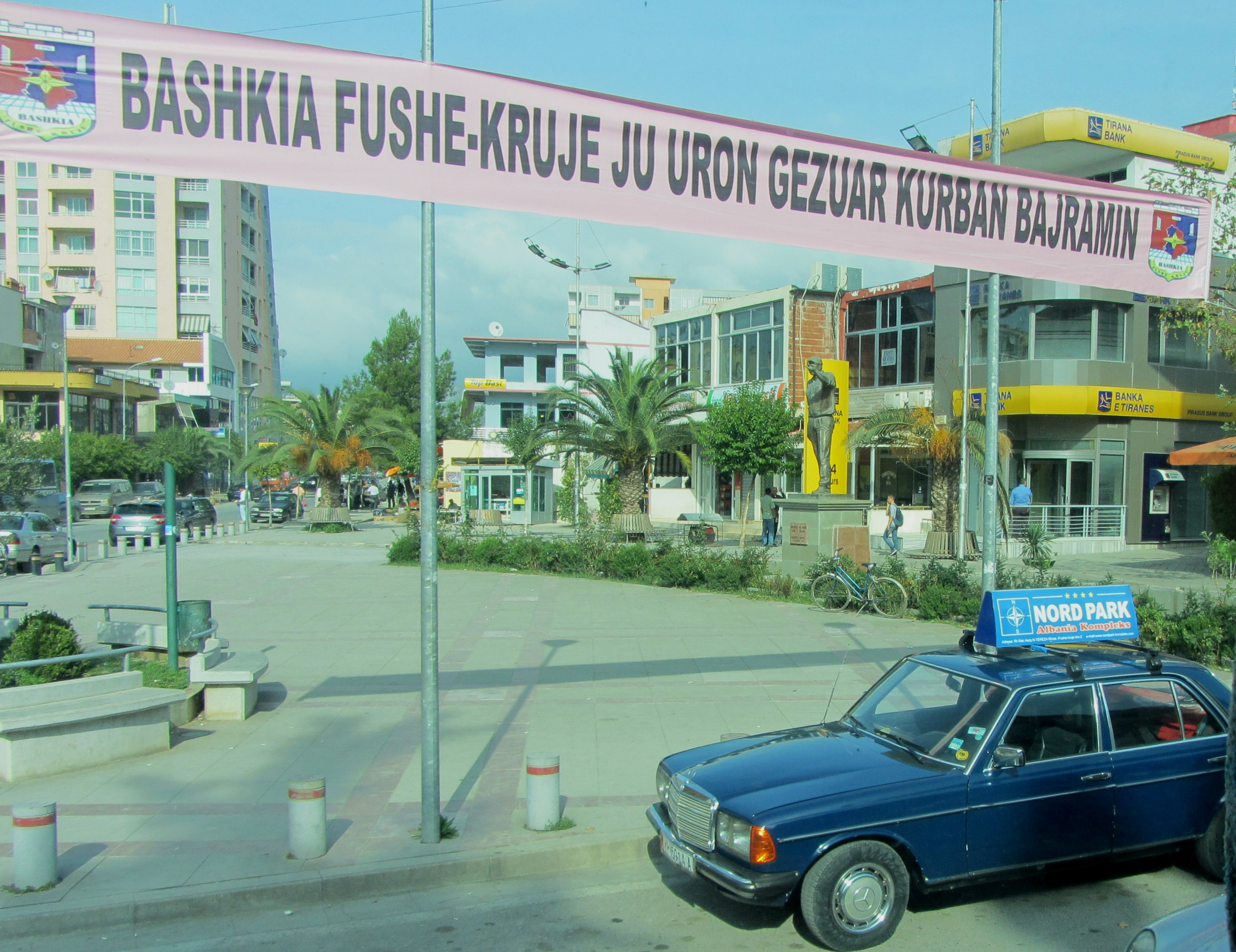
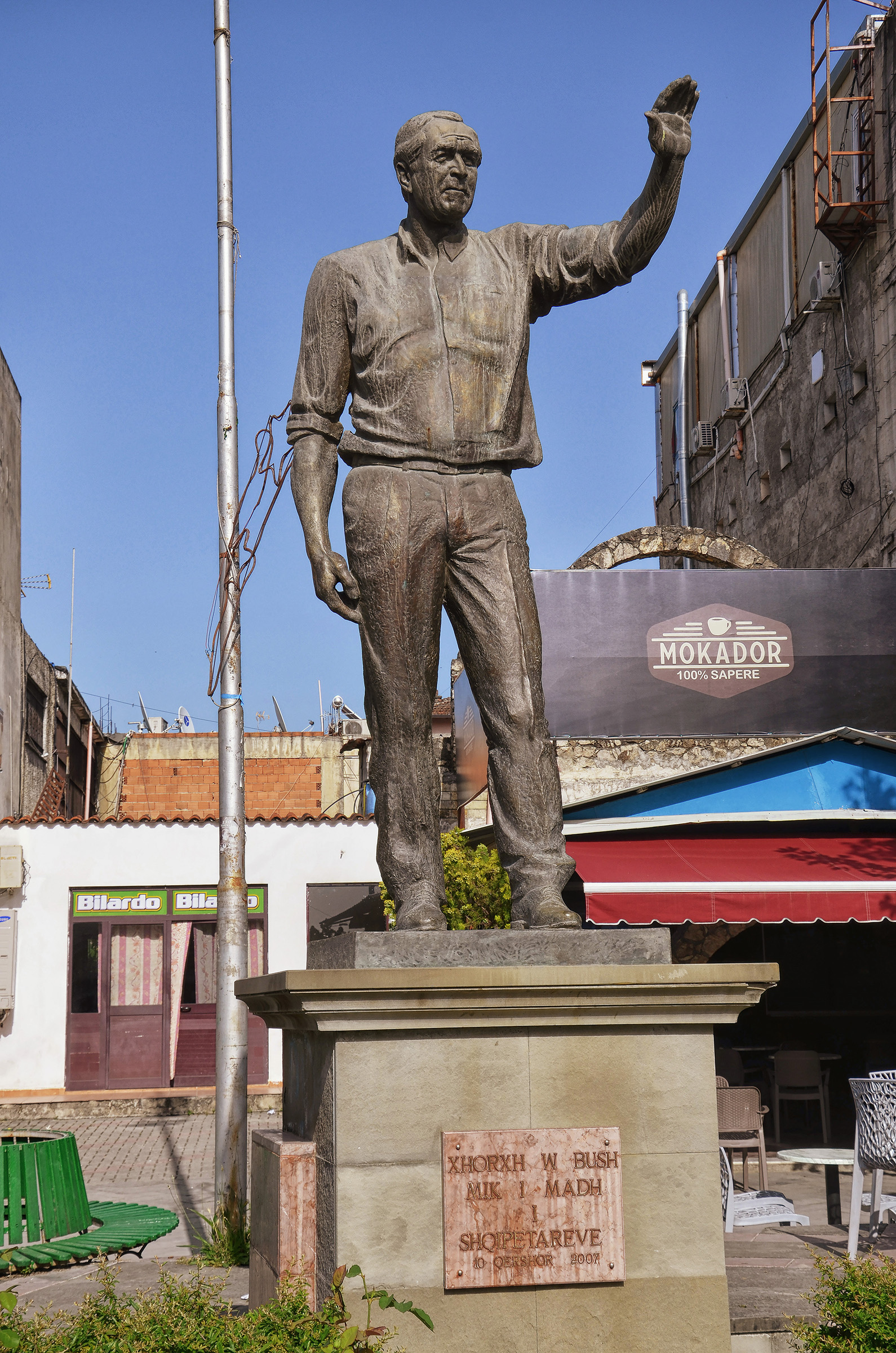
- From the top, Town centre, Bush Square, The George W. Bush Monument

- Location within Albania
- Coordinates: 41°29′N 19°43′E
- Country: Albania
- County: Durrës
- Municipality: Krujë
  - Administrative unit: 45.73 km^{2} (17.66 sq mi)

Population (2023)
  - Administrative unit: 17,877
  - Administrative unit density: 390.9/km^{2} (1,012/sq mi)
- Time zone: UTC+1 (CET)
  - Summer (DST): UTC+2 (CEST)
- Postal Code: 1502
- Area Code: 0563

Fushë-Krujë is a city in Durrës County, Albania. At the 2015 local government reform it became a subdivision of the municipality Krujë. The population as of the 2023 census is 17,877.

Historical population
Year	Pop.	±%
1989	15,321	—
2001	18,441	+20.4%
2011	18,477	+0.2%
2023	17,877	−3.2%

The city has gained wider fame due to President George W. Bush's visit on Sunday, 10 June 2007. A statue was erected in his honor in 2011.

Fushë-Krujë has been designated as the future site of a cement factory to be operated by Antea Cement Sh.A., a subsidiary of Titan Cement of Greece. The Fushe Kruja Cement Factory is already operating in the town. It is a subsidiary of the Seament Group who are a leader in Sea Bulk Shipping and also own the Elbasan Cement Factory in Elbasan.

The etymology of Fushë-Krujë from the Albanian language translates into English as “Field of Kruja” a field of the city.

== Climate ==
Fushë-Krujë has a mediterranean climate (Köppen climate classification: Csa).

Climate data for Fushë-Krujë
Month	Jan	Feb	Mar	Apr	May	Jun	Jul	Aug	Sep	Oct	Nov	Dec	Year
Mean daily maximum °C (°F)	10.1 (50.2)	11.6 (52.9)	14.5 (58.1)	18.2 (64.8)	22.9 (73.2)	27.1 (80.8)	29.4 (84.9)	29.3 (84.7)	25.8 (78.4)	20.5 (68.9)	15.5 (59.9)	11.6 (52.9)	19.7 (67.5)
Daily mean °C (°F)	6.7 (44.1)	8.0 (46.4)	10.3 (50.5)	13.7 (56.7)	18.0 (64.4)	22.1 (71.8)	24.1 (75.4)	23.9 (75.0)	20.6 (69.1)	16.0 (60.8)	11.8 (53.2)	8.2 (46.8)	15.3 (59.5)
Mean daily minimum °C (°F)	3.3 (37.9)	4.5 (40.1)	6.1 (43.0)	9.2 (48.6)	13.2 (55.8)	17.1 (62.8)	18.9 (66.0)	18.6 (65.5)	15.5 (59.9)	11.6 (52.9)	8.2 (46.8)	4.9 (40.8)	10.9 (51.7)
Average precipitation mm (inches)	150 (5.9)	135 (5.3)	114 (4.5)	97 (3.8)	83 (3.3)	55 (2.2)	33 (1.3)	42 (1.7)	78 (3.1)	116 (4.6)	172 (6.8)	161 (6.3)	1,236 (48.8)

== Honorary citizens ==
- George W. Bush
- Drita Ziri - Miss Earth 2023 winner, the First Albanian to win the pageant as the youngest titleholder at age of 18. And also the first Albanian woman to win one of the Big Four international beauty pageants.
