= Albanian Airlines =

Albanian international airline (1991–2011)

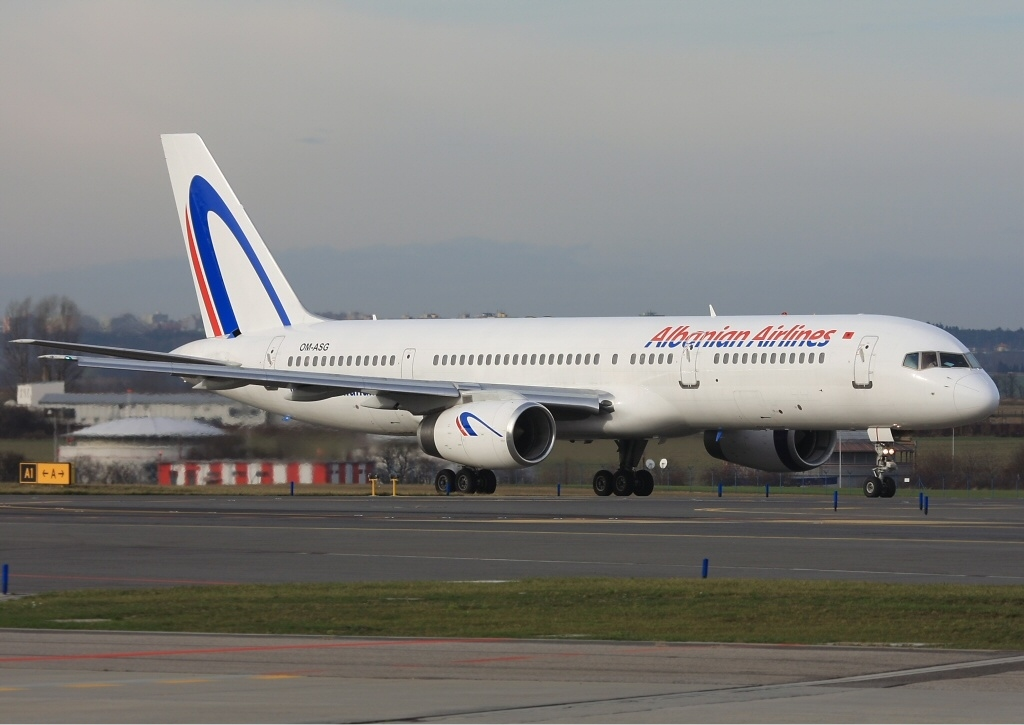
- Boeing 757
IATA	ICAO	Call sign
LV	LBC	ALBANIAN
- Founded: 1991 as Arberia Airlines, renamed Albanian Airlines in 1992
- Ceased operations: 2011
- Hubs: Tirana International Airport Nënë Tereza
- Fleet size: 22
- Destinations: 37
- Parent company: Advanced Construction Group (ACG)
- Headquarters: Tirana, Albania
- Website: www.albanianair.com

Albanian Airlines MAK Sh.p.k (trading as Albanian Airlines) was an airline based in Tirana, Albania. It operated scheduled international services. Its main hub was Tirana International Airport Nënë Tereza. On 11 November 2011, Albania's Civil Aviation Authority revoked the license of Albanian Airlines.

== History ==
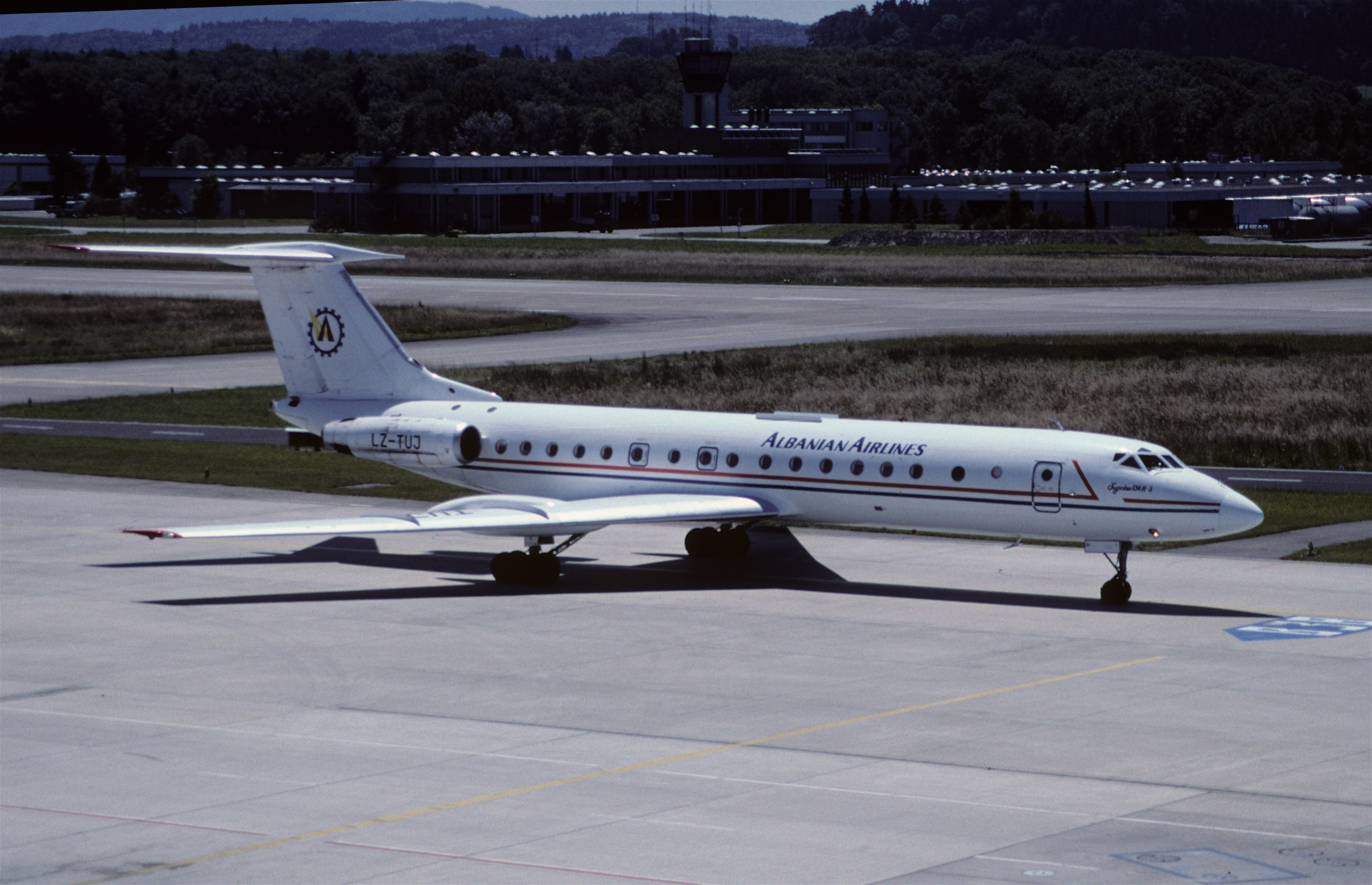
A Tupolev 134 inherited from Arberia Airlines

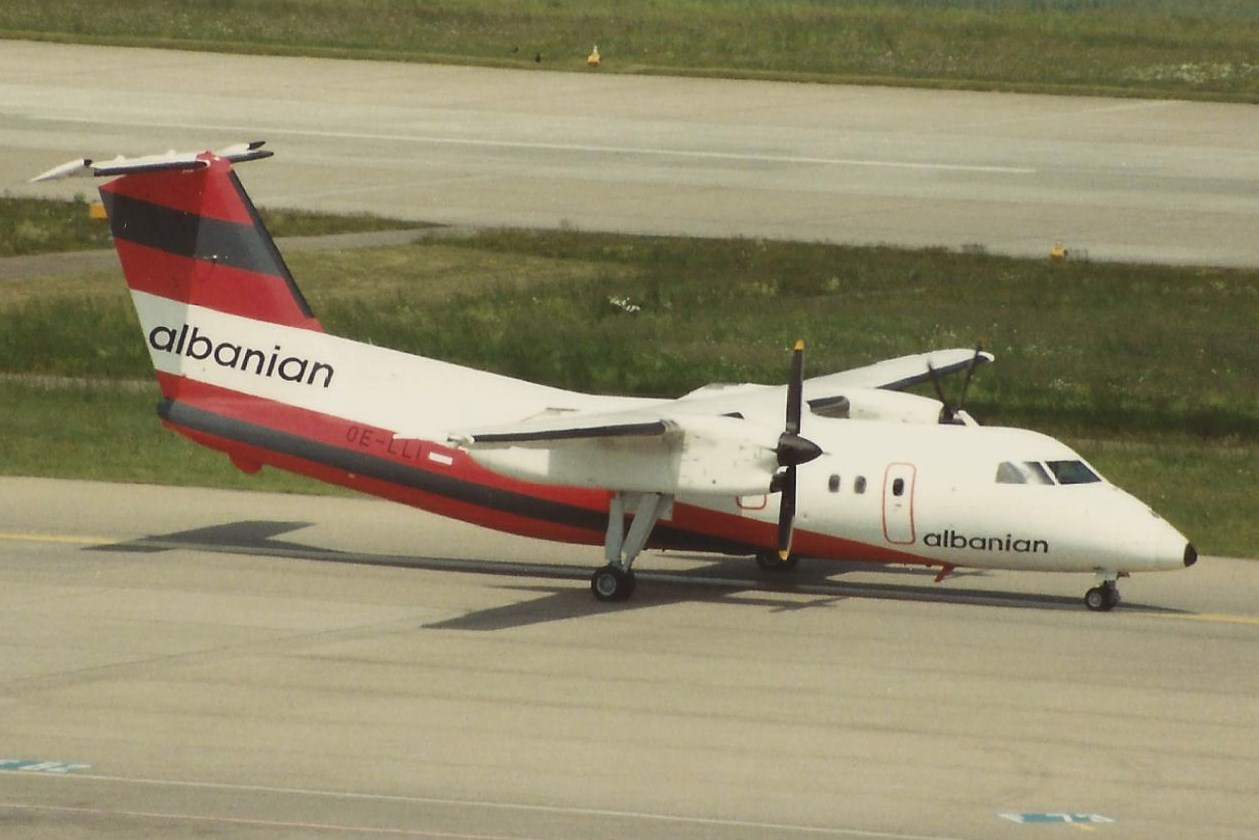
Leased De Havilland Canada Dash 8-102

The airline was initially established in May 1991 using Tupolev Tu-134 aircraft and operated as Arberia Airlines. It was the "private airline" of politicians of communist Albania. The airline was renamed Albanian Airlines in May 1992 and started operations open to the public on 20 June 1992. The renamed airline was formed as a joint venture between the state-owned Albtransport agency and Tyrolean Airways of Austria. The airline started operations with a single leased De Havilland Canada Dash 8-102 flown by Canadian pilots and maintained by Canadian engineers. Tyrolean interrupted the contract in 1994, taking back the Dash 8.

=== Privatisation ===
Albanian Airlines was privatised in that same year and sold to Kuwait-based M.A. Kharafi & Sons Group. It relaunched scheduled operations on 1 October 1995 with a single Airbus A320 aircraft leased from Shorouk Air of Egypt. The airline was restructured in 1997 and expanded its regular flights to various European destinations. Seasonal flights were also operated to tourist destinations on the Red Sea. By 2001, the air carrier operated a fleet of four Tupolev Tu-134 aircraft on scheduled services from Tirana to Bologna, Frankfurt, Istanbul, Pristina, Rome and Zürich. In July 2001, Albanian Airlines started upgrading its fleet by gradually removing Tupolevs and acquired the first BAe 146 regional jetliner. Two more BAe 146s were added in 2003 and 2004. This upgrading process allowed the company to expand to new important markets, such as Belgium and Germany.

==== Changes of ownership ====
Original logo of Albanian Airlines

In August 2008, Albanian Airlines was purchased by the Advanced Construction Group (ACG) Sh.p.k. from Tirana, Albania, by the President Yahia Farwati, who purchased 100% of capital from M.A. Kharafi & Sons Group. On 14 August 2009, it was announced that Albanian Airlines had been sold to Turkish Evsen Group 93% while the residual 7% was retained by the Advanced Construction Group. In this same year the carrier saw the addition of two Boeing 737 as well as one Boeing 757, all of which were leased from Air Slovakia. In parallel with this investment came a new corporate image, addition of destinations, and more aircraft for the fleet. On 9 October 2009, it was announced that Albanian Airlines would soon open new destinations such as Paris, Amsterdam, Milan, Rome, Athens, Jeddah, Beijing and later the United States of America.

Along with lower amount of travelling passenger, the addition of more Fokker 100 jetliners, and the use of a Boeing 747 in scheduled routes, exacerbated operational, technical and financial problems, including the repossession of all leased aircraft from Air Slovakia. Civil Aviation Authority revoked the license of Albanian Airlines on 10 November 2011 and all flying operations were stopped.

In March 2012, the 93% of Albanian Airlines shares was returned to Advanced Construction Group (ACG) of Yahia Farwati by a court decision. So, Advanced Construction Group (ACG) owned 100% of the shares. After this date there were no flight operations at all.

== See also ==
- List of defunct airlines of Albania
