= Civil Aviation Authority (Albania) =

Government agency of Albania

- Autoriteti i Aviacionit Civil
- Official logo

Agency overview
- Formed: 3 February 1991
- Jurisdiction: Albania
- Headquarters: Tirana
- Agency executive: Maksim Ethemaj, Executive Director
- Website: www.aac.gov.al

The Albanian Civil Aviation Authority (AAC) (Albanian: Autoriteti i Aviacionit Civil të Shqipërisë), formerly the General Directorate of Civil Aviation (Albanian: Drejtoria e Pergjithshme e Aviacionit Civil, DPAC) is the civil aviation authority of Albania, headquartered in Tirana.
