= Eva Murati =

Albanian actress and TV host (born 1995)

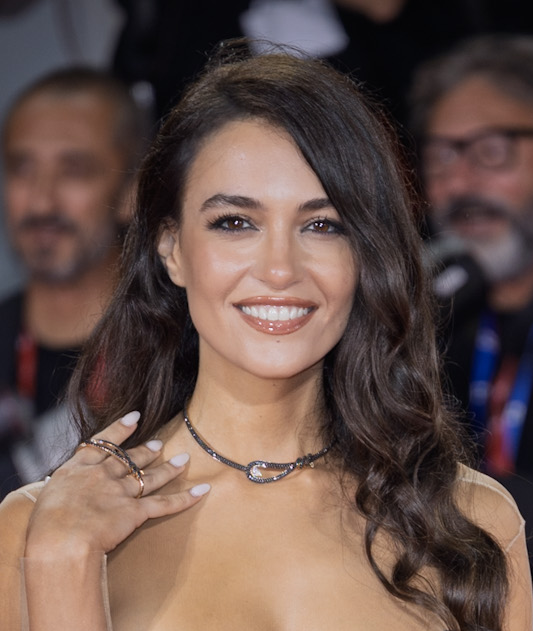
- Eva Murati, 2025
- Born: 25 May 1995 (age 31); Elbasan, Albania
- Education: Faculty of Law, University of Tirana
- Occupations: Actress; model; sports broadcaster
- Years active: 2011–present
- Known for: Hosting UEFA Champions League broadcasts in Albania
- Website: Official website at the Wayback Machine (archived 2019-03-28)

Eva Murati (born 25 May 1995) is an Albanian sports broadcaster, model and actress. Starting her career at the age of 15, she became known in Albanian show business through appearances in commercials and modeling work. She has hosted programs primarily for Albanian television networks and has appeared in film and television productions.

Murati began her television career with Antilope in 2013 and later co-hosted Duartrokitje alongside Adi Krasta on Agon Channel. In 2016, she moved to Vizion Plus, where she hosted Miss Universe Albania and VIP Zone. She later hosted the Studio UEFA Champions League and Sports Week on Tring Sport. She made her film debut in The Outlaw (2014), followed by roles in Skanderbeg (2016), Ti mund të më quash Xhon (2017), Familja Kuqezi (2019–2020s), and Policë për kokë (2023).

Her additional screen credits include appearances in the short films Une si ti (2021) and Gravity (2022), as well as a guest appearance in Kokrrat (2015), hosting Finding Miss Universe (2016), and participation in the TV show Kangur (2018). On stage, she performed in theatrical productions including The Threepenny Opera (2013) as Polly Peachum and The Two Gentlemen of Verona (2014) as Sylvia.

== Early life ==
=== Early childhood ===
Murari was born in Elbasan, but her family moved to the capital of Albania, Tirana, when she was at the age of 6. She has two younger siblings, a brother and a sister. She is the granddaughter of Pandi Stratobërdha, hydrotechnical engineer, founder of the University of Tirana in 1957 and member of Academy of Sciences of Albania since its founding in 1972.

=== Education ===
While living in Elbasan, she attended Imelda Lambertini, the Italian school where she learned to speak Italian and was introduced to Italian culture, which would later have a big influence in her life. After her family moved in Tirana, she attended Udha e Shkronjave school. In the sixth grade, she moved to The Independent College of Tirana, where she finished middle school. Murati completed her high school studies at Petro Nini Luarasi high school, where she succeeded in her first audition and made her first steps into show business. Later, she studied law at the Faculty of Law, University of Tirana.

She took part in Tirana Teens and was part of the school drama club. Alongside her academic pursuits, she was selected for the debate team in multiple high school competitions. During her school years she competed for various years at Mathematics and General Knowledge Olympiad, where she achieved 8th place in National Ranking.

== Career ==
=== Modeling and commercials ===
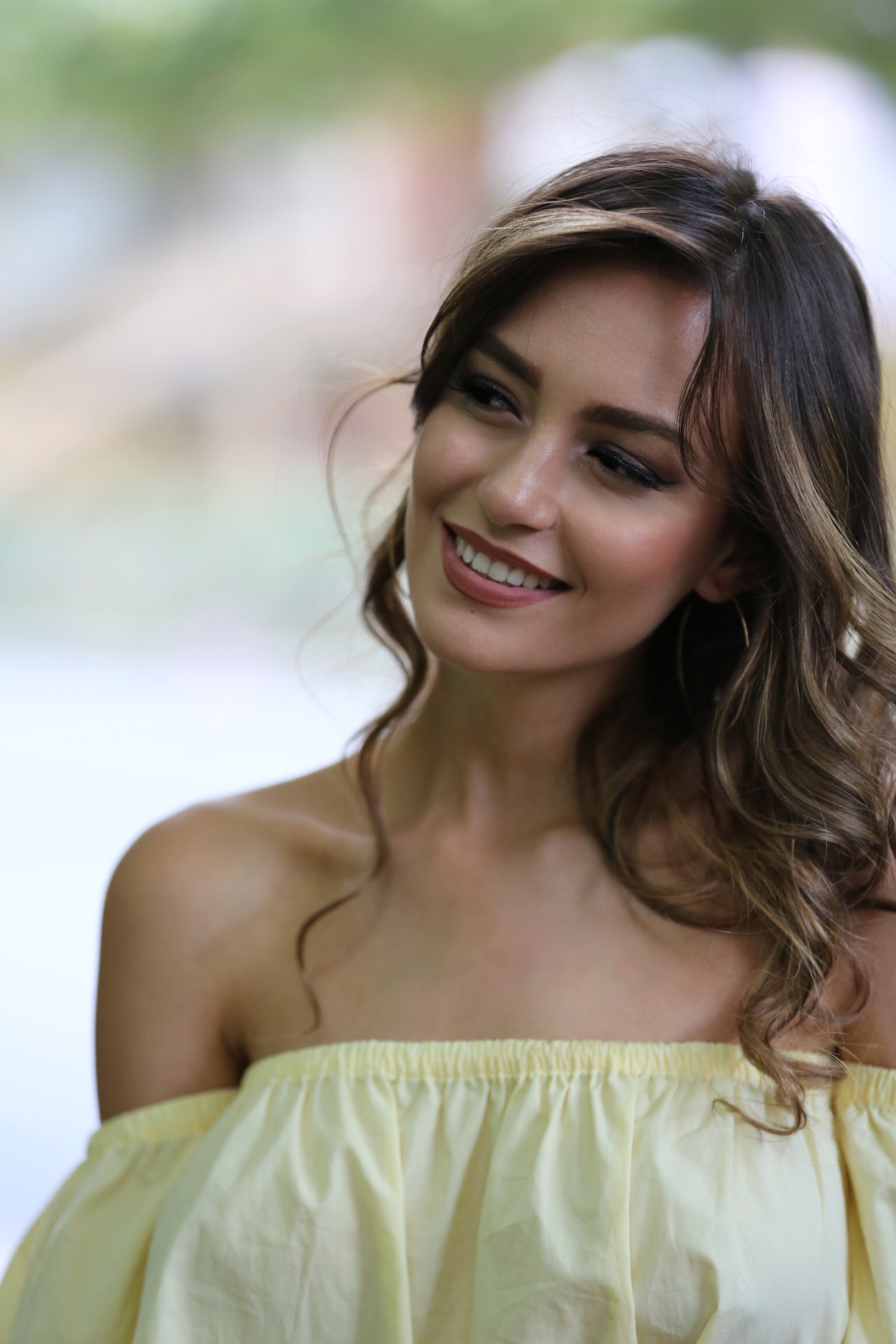
Eva Murati, 2017

After entering high school she participated in her first audition for Tirana East Gate which she won. Murati starred in the spot Bring a Friend for Eagle Mobile alongside comedian Gentian Zenelaj. The spot aired during the UEFA European Championship 2012.

Murati was the image of B52 Energy Drink in two commercials, Anything for You and Drink On in February 2012 and November 2012, respectively.

She appeared in the Aurela Gace’s music video TRANZIT which won the best video in the annual competition Netët e Klipit Shqiptar in May 2012.

In 2015, Murati was chosen to represent Albania in the Vodafone Italia commercial produced by to promote calls from Italy to Albania. The company chose her after seeing Murati's interview with Italian actress Manuela Arcuri which she previously did in Agon Channel. The campaign lasted a year and was distributed all over Italy.

She became the image of Albtelecom in the role of Era in the sitcom-like commercials. She starred in Intro Era, Lea, Dhuratat e Mirënjohjes, Annoying Chef, Intro Jona, ALBwifi, Déjà vu, Love, You deserve More and Super-Family from April 2016 to May 2017. After starring in the first Albtelecom commercial, Murati was chosen by this company as a spokesperson. She presented the company in various events such as UEFA Euro 2016.

She modeled for Sherri Hill Albania in 2013 in Berat photographed by Fadil Berisha.

Murati appeared as a cover girl for Vip Albania magazine in December 2013 Later she appeared in the monthly Who magazine in the April 2016 issue for presenting Miss Universe Albania. The cover of Living magazine Spring 2017 issue was to introduce to the public her new project, UEFA Champions League. Eva Murati is the youngest person to appear in the cover of this magazine, at the age of 21.

=== Hosting and presentation ===
==== Agon Channel ====
Eva had her breakthrough in television at the age of 18 when she started working at Agon Channel, an Italian-Albanian television channel, in October 2013 where she was the host of primetime show Antilope, which gave her the opportunity to interview Italian stars such as Manuela Arcuri, Enzo Iacchetti, etc. Later she co-hosted the gala show Duartrokitje with one of the historic personalities of Albanian television, Adi Krasta. The show aimed to bring focus to Albanian artists who live and work abroad. In the summer of 2014 Murati left Agon Channel to pursue other projects.

==== Vizion Plus ====
Murati took a year off from hosting to focus on her acting career by starring in films and TV series. In March 2016, she made a return to hosting when she was offered to host Finding Miss Universe Albania. The beauty pageant had a different structure from the previous years, as the show lasted for four months.

At the start of the new television season 2016-17 she hosted the newest program of Vizion Plus national television, VIP Zone, a cultural and lifestyle program. She interviewed various public figures. The show also promoted tourism and new cultures.

She then hosted Studio UEFA Champions League, which started in January 2017. This meant a wider audience because of the influence that football has in Albania. After the positive reception the program had, Murati will also host the Studio UEFA Champions League 2017-18. She presented Sports Week, which aired every Sunday at Tring Sport News HD from June 2017.

==== Other presentations ====
Murati presented One Billion Rising, the feministic movement at Dëshmoret e Kombit Avenue, in which thousands of women took part by dancing the Break the Chain choreography.

Murati hosted the 8th of March annual concert at the Palace of Congresses, which was in honor of International Women's Day. This event was attended by many political figures and was concluded with a speech by then prime minister of Albania, Sali Berisha. On the behalf of the 100th anniversary of Albania's Independence, Murati hosted the concert on 29 November 2012. The 2016 New Year's Eve Classical Concert was hosted by Murati and TV host Xhani Shqerra.

=== Other appearances ===
She presented Miss Universe Albania, and was invited to be part of the jury at Miss Teen Albania 2016. Murati was also part of the jury in the TV Show Shopping Night aired in Vizion Plus and Living HD as a fashion adviser.

She appeared in the sketch-show Apartamenti 2XL, and various talk shows, cooking shows.

=== Film ===
Eva Murati made her debut as an actress in May 2013 in the short movie The Outlaw. The movie premiered in October 2013 in Tirana and was part of International Film Summerfest of Durrës.

In December 2016, Murati took part in the artistic project EKSOD by Justin Fernando Valls in role of Juna. Inspired by the political events of the time EKSOD produced by JFV Production showed the desire of young adults to leave Albania due to lack of opportunities and not achieving goals because of the corrupted system.

Murati starred in her first full-length movie Ti mund të më quash Xhon (transl. You can call me John) in the role of Alba Basha alongside Genti Kame, Gezim Rudi and Ermira Gjata. She initially won the audition for the role of Lorna, but she rejected it for personal reasons. In this teenage drama she played the free spirited teenager, who comes from a rich family with political engagement. She is also Lorna's best friend. The movie was produced by Papadhimitri Production. It premiered on 29 of March 2017 at Millennium and Imperial Cinemas.

=== TV series ===
In December 2015, Murati had her TV show debut as a guest star on Kokrrat. She appeared in the fifth episode of the series as a pharmacist and the lead character's love interest, by the name of Eva. The show was produced by Digitalb and also aired on T HD and IN TV.

In 2016 she starred in the TV show Skanderbeg in the role of Mara, the fictional sister of Albania's national hero, George Castriot Skanderbeg, alongside Laert Vasili, Ermal Mamaqi, Vedat Bajrami and Zyliha Miloti. The show it's considered as the highest budged series in the history of Albania. The TV series was directed by American director Adam Pray and produced by Digitalb and Cukali Production.

Eva Murati will star in the upcoming Kangur Tv Show TV show, written and directed by Luan Kryeziu, produced by Iliria Film Production. The show started production in June 2017 and is currently filming in Albania.

Her most recent project is Familja Kuqezi, which is currently filming.

=== Theater ===
Murati had her theatrical debut at Bertolt Brecht’s adaptation of The Threepenny Opera in the protagonist role of Polly Peachum. Later she proved herself as a singer and dancer in the musical adaptation of Shakespeare’s play The Two Gentlemen of Verona in the leading role of Sylvia.

== Personal life ==
Murati is an animal rights activist. When she hosted Miss Universe Albania, she became a supporter of the Albanian Red Cross and has been an active member since then. She has often expressed liberal ideas, although Murati has never expressed her political views.

Since the start of her career with the One Billion Rising movement, Murati has been considered a feminist and has always advocated for gender equality. She has expressed that there should be more reforms to support the emancipation of women, especially in Albania, and has used her platform to inspire young women to become more independent. Besides her native Albanian, she is fluent in English, Italian and Spanish, and has basic knowledge of French.

Murati is a self-professed football fan and supports the Italian team Juventus. Her father, Erjon, was also a footballer.

== Filmography ==
As of 2020s

=== Film ===
Year	Title	Role	Notes
2014	The Outlaw	Eva	Short
2017	You Can Call Me John	Alba Basha	
2021	Une si ti	The director of the orphanage	Short
2022	Gravity		Short
2023	Policë për kokë	Mysterious female	

=== Television ===
Year	Title	Role	Notes
2013–2014	Antilope	Herself / Host	
2013–2014	Duartrokitje	Herself / Host	
2015	Kokrrat	Guest appearance	
2016	Finding Miss Universe	Herself / Host	
2016	Skanderbeg	Mara	
2016	VIP Zone	Herself / Host	
2017–present	Studio Champions League	Herself / Host	
2017–present	Sports Week	Herself / Host	
2018	Kangur	—N/a	TV Show
2019–2020s	Familja Kuqezi	Hera	Recurring role

=== Stage ===
Year	Title	Role	Notes
2013	The Threepenny Opera	Polly Peachum	
2014	The Two Gentlemen of Verona	Sylvia	

== See also ==
- Television in Albania
- Tip TV
- TV Klan
