= Folk Plus =

Albanian television channel

- Country: Albania
- Headquarters: Tirana, Albania

Programming
- Language: Albanian
- Picture format: 4:3

History
- Launched: 2000
- Former names: STV-2 (1990-e)

Folk + or Folk Plus is a music channel that broadcasts Albanian folklore music of the Albanian-speaking regions. It broadcasts daily for 24 hours exclusively in Tring terrestrial and satellite digital platform.

== See also ==
- Television in Albania
- Communication in Albania
- Vizion Plus
- TV Klan
- Tip TV
- FAX News
