= Telecommunications in Albania =

Telecommunications in Albania include radio, television, fixed and mobile telephones, and the Internet.

== History ==
Until 1990, Albania was extremely isolated and controlled, and installation and maintenance of a modern system of international and domestic telecommunications was precluded. Callers previously needed operator assistance even to make domestic long-distance calls.

As of 1992, Albania's telephone density was the lowest in Europe, at 1.4 units for every 100 inhabitants. Tirana accounted for about 13,000 of the country's 42,000 direct lines; Durrës, the main port city, ranked second with 2,000 lines; the rest were concentrated in Shkodër, Elbasan, Vlorë, Gjirokastër, and other towns. At one time, each village had a telephone but during the land redistribution of the early 1990s peasants knocked out service to about 1,000 villages by removing telephone wire for fencing. As of 1992, most of Albania's telephones were obsolete, low-quality East European models, some dating from the 1940s; workers at a Tirana factory assembled a small number of telephones from Italian parts.

In the early 1990s, Albania had 240 microwave circuits carrying international calls to Italy and 180 to Greece. The Albanian telephone company had also installed two U-20 Italtel digital exchanges. The exchange in Tirana handled international, national, and local calls; the Durrës exchange handled only local calls. Two United States firms handled direct-dial calls from the United States to Tirana.

At present the land lines are overloaded, and it is difficult to receive a telephone number. As a result, the number of mobile phones has skyrocketed in the bigger cities.

== Radio and television ==
- Radio stations:
  - 2 public radio networks and roughly 25 private radio stations; several international broadcasters are available (2010);
  - FM 56 (3 national, 53 local), shortwave 1 (2008).
- Radios: 1 million (2001).
- Television stations:
  - 3 public TV networks, one of which transmits by satellite to Albanian-language communities in neighboring countries; more than 60 private TV stations; many viewers can pick up Italian and Greek TV broadcasts via terrestrial reception; cable TV service is available (2010);
  - 76 (3 national, 73 local); note - 3 cable networks (2008).
- Television sets: 1 million (2008).

The state broadcaster in Albania, Radio Televizioni Shqiptar (RTSh, Albanian Radio and TV), operates national radio and television networks. It has competition from scores of privately owned stations. According to a 2002 survey the broadcaster with the largest audience is TV Klan.

Television is the most influential medium. Many Albanians watch Italian and Greek stations via terrestrial reception.

The BBC World Service (103.9 MHz in the capital, Tirana), Deutsche Welle, Radio France Internationale, and the Voice of America are available.

== Telephones ==
- Calling code: +355
- International call prefixes: 069,068,067
- Main lines:
  - 197,690 (2021)
- Mobile cellular:
  - 2,635,466 (2021)
- Telephone system: Albania's small telecom market has experienced some significant changes in recent years; upgrades were made to the fixed-line infrastructure to support broadband services; fixed-line telephony use and penetration in Albania is declining steadily as subscribers migrate to mobile solutions; the mobile sector is well provided with LTE networks, while operators have invested in 5G; some of these efforts have been made in conjunction with neighboring Kosovo, with the intention of a seamless 5G corridor along the highway connecting the two countries; the country has long sought accession to the European Union (EU) which has benefited its telecoms sector through closer scrutiny of its regulatory regime and through the injection of funding to help modernize infrastructure (2021)
- Satellite earth stations: unknown.
- Communications cables: Submarine cables provide connectivity to Italy, Croatia, and Greece; the Trans-Balkan Line, a combination submarine and land fiber-optic system between Albania and Italy, provides additional connectivity to Bulgaria, North Macedonia, and Turkey (2011). Two other cable systems serving Albania are the ADRIA-1 (Croatia, Albania, Greece) and the Italy-Albania.

== Internet ==
- Top-level domain: .al
- Internet users:
  - 2.291 million users, 132nd in the world; (2021).
- Fixed broadband: 148,882 subscriptions, 91st in the world; 5.0% of population, 103rd in the world (2012).
- Wireless broadband: 552,676 subscriptions, 90th in the world; 18.4% of the population, 74th in the world (2012).
- Internet hosts: 15,528 hosts, 124th in the world (2012).
- IPv4: 323,840 addresses allocated, less than 0.05% of the world total, 3.4 addresses per 1000 people (2012).
- Internet service providers: 10 ISPs (2001). (2 with national coverage and 8 providers with domestic coverage)

Providers with national coverage:

- One Albania
- Vodafone Albania

Defunct providers:

- ALBtelecom
- Plus
- AMC (part of Cosmote)

Internet broadband services were initiated in 2005, but growth has been slow. Internet cafes are popular in Tirana and have started to spread outside the capital.

Eutelsat satellite broadband is being used to provide free public Internet access in rural Albanian post offices, schools, and local government offices.

=== Internet censorship and surveillance ===
There are no government restrictions on access to the Internet or reports that the government monitors e-mail or Internet chat rooms without appropriate legal authority. The constitution provides for freedom of speech and press, and the government generally respects these rights in practice. However, there are reports that the government and businesses influence and pressure the media. The constitution and law prohibit arbitrary interference with privacy, family, home, or correspondence, and the government generally respects these prohibitions in practice.

== See also ==
- BBC Albanian service
- Media of Albania
- Economy of Albania
