= Vodafone Albania =

Albanian telecommunications company

Vodafone Albania SH.A.

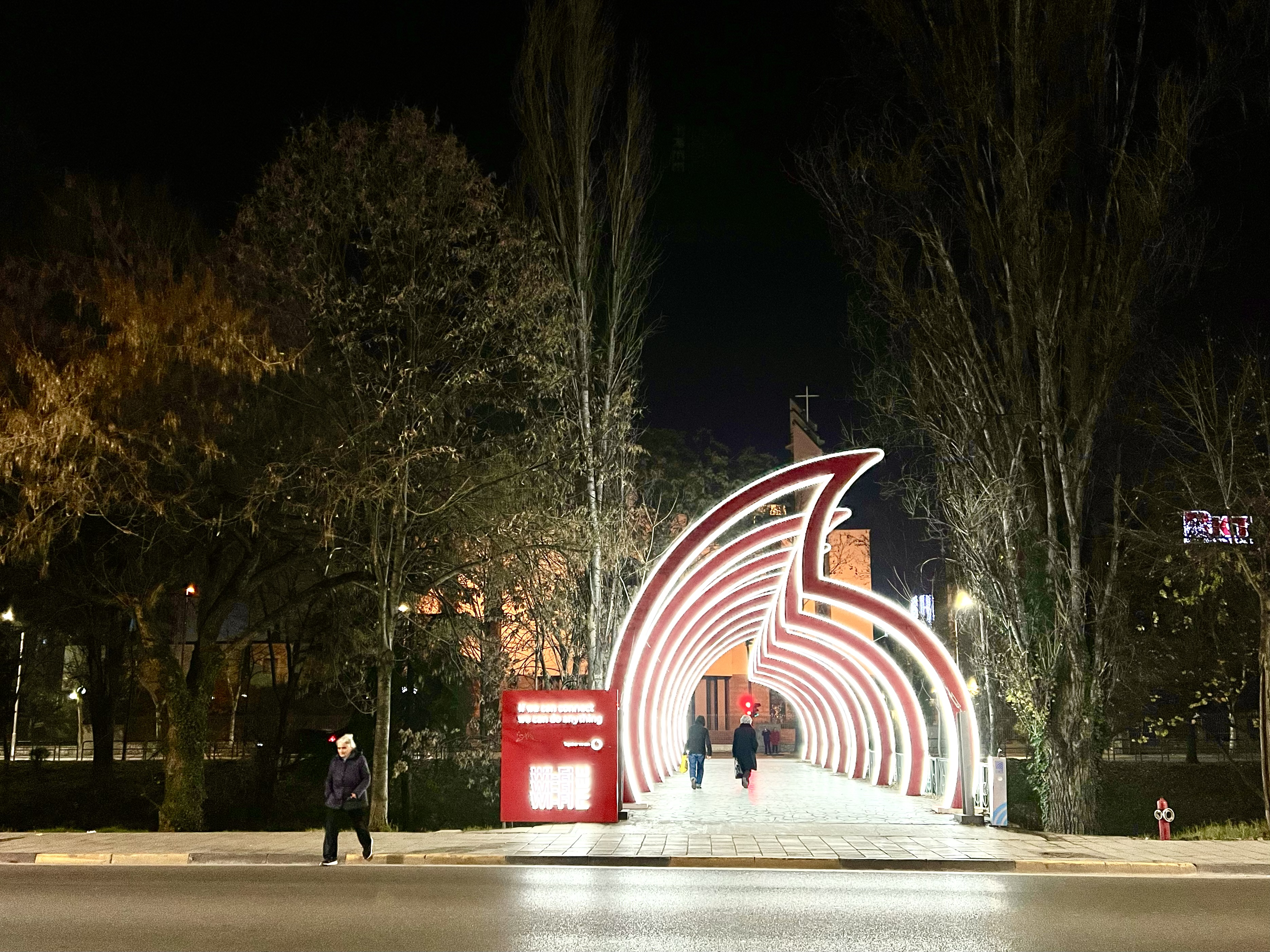
- Vodafone branded bridge in Tirana
- Company type: Private
- Industry: Telecommunications
- Founded: 3 August 2001; 24 years ago
- Founder: Vodafone Group
- Headquarters: Tirana, Albania
- Number of locations: 146
- Area served: Albania
- Key people: Balazs Revesz (CEO)
- Products: Broadband; Fixed-line telephony; Mobile telephony; Internet
- Owner: Vodafone Europe (49.99%); Vodafone Greece (50%)
- Number of employees: 398 direct employees and 561 indirect employees
- Subsidiaries: ABCom
- Website: www.vodafone.al

Vodafone Albania SH.A is a major telecommunications company based in Tirana, Albania. It is part of the Vodafone Group.

== Technology ==
Vodafone Albania started offering GSM services on August 3, 2001, after AMC started doing so in 1996.

In 2011, Vodafone was the first to launch 3G services. 4 years later, Vodafone was again first to launch a 4G/4G+ network in the country.

In 2018, Plus, the 4th largest mobile network provider, ceased operations in Albania. Vodafone agreed to buy 50% of the frequencies that Plus used to operate, alongside Telekom Albania (now One Albania).

On February 12, 2019, Albania's telecoms watchdog, Electronic and Postal Communications Authority (AKEP) announced the conclusion of the first round of its 800 MHz auction, confirming that Vodafone Albania was the only provider to submit a bid for the frequencies. The carrier offered just over EUR 7.44 million (USD 8.4 million) for a 2×10 MHz block of spectrum in the 800 MHz band. AKEP noted that its bid evaluation committee will now review the legal, economic and technical documentation accompanying Vodafone’s bid.

On October 16, 2019, AKEP gave the authorisation to test 5G networks on the 3600 MHz-3700 MHz frequency band. On October 30, it was publicly tested, alongside important state officials, such as Prime Minister, Edi Rama. The full rollout of 5G to consumers has commenced on November 26, 2024. As of August 2025, Vodafone Albania expanded its 5G coverage in Tirana, Durrës, Fier, Gjirokastër and in popular tourist destinations around Albania.

== ABCom ==
On 29 October 2020, Vodafone Albania agreed to acquire the country's largest cable operator ABCom. "This transaction is part of Vodafone Group’s wider strategy to enhance its mobile businesses with broadband and pay TV services", Vodafone said in a press release.

The acquisition enabled Vodafone Albania to become a full service telecoms company by offering fixed and mobile communications and TV services to households and businesses. As of the end of June 2020, ABCom had 86.000 broadband subscribers behind One Albania with 133.000 subscribers.

== Market share ==
Vodafone Albania, as per Q1 2019, has 3.66 million subscribers, out of which there are 2.5 million active users. An active user is defined as having communication in the last three months.

The regulatory authority for telecommunication in Albania is the Electronic and Postal Communications Authority.

Rank	Operator	Technology	Subscribers (in millions)	Ownership	MCC / MNC
1	One Albania • Includes the former ALBtelecom Mobile network.	GSM-900/1800 MHz (GPRS, EDGE) 2100 MHz UMTS, HSDPA, HSUPA, HSPA, HSPA+, DC-HSPA+ 800/1800/2600 MHz LTE, LTE-A VoLTE 3400/3500 MHz 5G NR	1.914 (Q3 2021)	4iG	27601 27603
2	Vodafone Albania	GSM-900/1800 MHz (GPRS, EDGE) 2100 MHz UMTS, HSDPA, HSUPA, HSPA, HSPA+, DC-HSPA+ 800/1800/2100/2600 MHz LTE, LTE-A, LTE-A Pro VoLTE 3400 MHz/3800 MHz 5G NR	1.975 (Q2 2025)	Vodafone Group plc (99.9%)	27602

== Economic and social investments ==
The company invested more than €1,415 million in Albania including investments in infrastructure, spectrum, regulatory fees, distribution channels, human resources etc. Only in 2016-17, Vodafone Albania invested €32 million in network infrastructure and about €16 million in spectrum acquisitions.

== Controversy ==
In 2017, operators changed the duration of their monthly packages to 28 days instead of 30. The matter was investigated by the Authority and the operators were ordered to resume the 30-day duration once again.

In 2019, the Albanian Competition Authority intervened after Vodafone Albania, Telekom Albania, and ALBtelecom increased their tariffs by ALL 200 and doubled the minimum recharge value from ALL 100 to ALL 200. The move sparked strong reactions from consumers who felt that the high price increase across three of the main providers was unfair. The action was reported to the Competition Authority. The three companies took action to lower the prices, following the instructions given by the competition authority.

== See also ==
- List of mobile network operators of Europe
- Vodafone Group
