= Tring Tring =

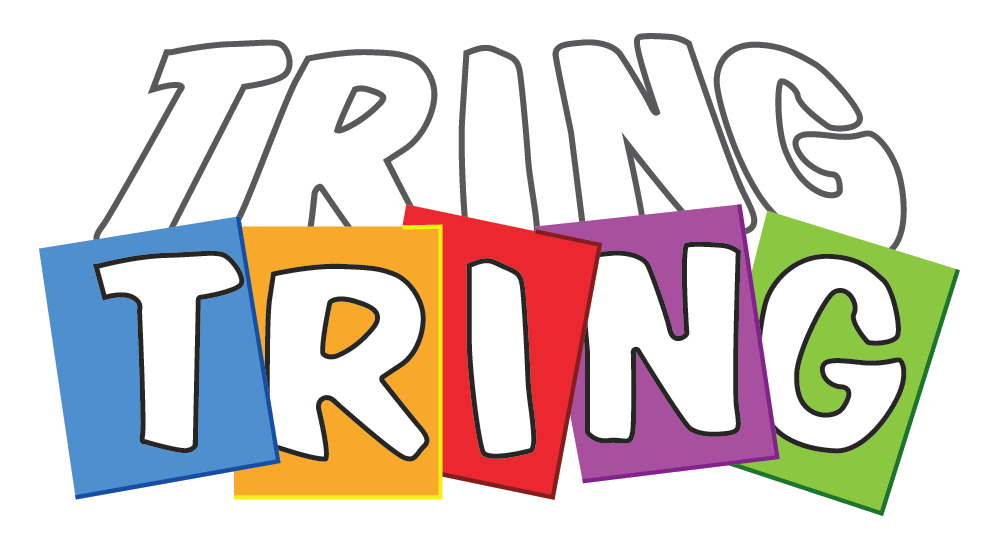
- Country: Albania
- Broadcast area: Nationwide
- Headquarters: Tirana, Albania

Programming
- Language: Albanian

Ownership
- Owner: Tring TV
- Parent: Tring
- Sister channels: Tip TV; Tring Kids; Bubble TV

History
- Launched: May 1, 2009; 17 years ago

Tring Tring is an Albanian TV channel for children aged 3-6. Tring Tring offers a selection of Albanian-dubbed animated series and films. It also produces original Albanian-language educational programming. Tring Tring was launched on 1 May 2009 by the Tring platform.

== Programs ==
=== Original productions ===
- Mirëmëngjes
- Artist Tak Fak
- Plastelina magjike
- Të mësojmë së bashku
- My Little English Book
- Erdhën shkronjat
- Art&Fun
- Hip Hop Show
- Na ishte njëherë
- Unë gatuaj

=== Syndicated programming ===
- Ace Lightning (Epoka e Viktimat)
- Action Man
- Barbe-Rouge (Piratët e Kuq)
- Battle B-Daman (B-Daman)
- Bakugan Battle Brawlers (Bakugan Lufta e Betejës)
- Ben 10
- Ben 10: Alien Force (Ben 10 Forca Alien)
- Ben 10: Ultimate Alien (Ben 10 Alieni i plotë)
- Bernard (Arushi Bernard)
- Bugs Bunny (Bags Bani)
- Canimals (Kanaçet gazmore)
- Cubix (Kubiks)
- Daigunder (Daigander)
- Digimon Adventure (Digimon)
- Digimon Tamers (Digimon Tamas)
- Eon Kid (Fëmija i hekurt)
- Farhat: The Prince of the Desert (Farhati)
- Fishtronaut (Astropeshku)
- Gormiti
- Gormiti Nature Unleashed (Gormiti Natyra e çliruar)
- Kung Fu Dino Posse (Kung Fu Dino)
- Maisy (Meizi)
- Masha and the Bear (Masha dhe Ariu)
- Mickey Mouse Clubhouse (Shtëpia e Miushit Miki)
- Monsuno
- Mr. Bean: The Animated Series (Mr. Bean)
- Musti
- Regal Academy (Akademia Mbretërore)
- Superman
- Kambu (TV series)
- Kirby: Right Back at Ya! (Kirbi)
- Ada shkencëtarja
- Milo (Lepurushi Milo)
- Miffy and Friends (Mifi dhe miqtë)
- In the Night Garden... (Në kopshtin e ëndrrave)
- Oggy and the Cockroaches
- Pat & Stan (Peti dhe Steni)
- Peppa Pig (Derrkucja Pepa)
- Pingu
- Pluster World (Bota e Pluster)
- Pocoyo (Pokojo)
- Popeye the Sailor (Popai)
- PopPixie
- Prudence Petitpas (Prudence Petitpa)
- Pucca
- Roary the Racing Car (RORI, makina e garave)
- Saint Seiya (Kalorësit e Seiyas)
- Shaun the Sheep (Ferma)
- Spider Riders (Kalorësit e Merimangave)
- Strawberry Shortcake (Kek i shkurtër me luleshtrydhe)
- Sid the Science Kid (Sid, djali shkencëtar)
- The Magic School Bus (Autobusi magjik i shkollës)
- The Fairytaler (Përrallat e Andersenit)
- The Invisible Man (Njeriu i padukshëm)
- The Legend of Zorro (Legjenda e Zorros)
- The New Adventures of Ocean Girl (Aventurat e reja të vajzës së Oqeanit)
- The New Woody Woodpecker Show (Qukapiku Udi)
- Tokyo Mew Mew (Vajzat mjau)
- Tom and Jerry (Tomi dhe Xherri)
- Tinga Tinga Tales (Tinga Tinga)
- Tractor Tom (Traktor Tom)
- What's with Andy? (Ç'po shpik Andi?)
- Vicky & Johnny (Angus dhe Sheril)
- Viva Pinata
- Wow! Wow! Wubbzy! (Uau Uau Ubul)
- Yin Yang Yo! (Lepurushi Ji Jang)
- Winx Club
- Yu-Gi-Oh!
- Zoobabu (Kutia magjike)

=== Films ===
Tring Tring has aired multiple non-original films, including Disney and DreamWorks animated films and the Barbie animated films.

- A Christmas Carol (Këngët e Krishtlindjeve)
- Alice in Wonderland (Liza në botën e çudirave)
- The Archies in JugMan (Arçi dhe njeriu i egër)
- Aladdin
- Aladdin and the King of Thieves (Aladini dhe mbreti i hajdutëve)
- Anastasia
- Bambi
- Barbie in the Nutcracker (Barbi dhe Arrëthyesi)
- Barbie Fairytopia: Mermaidia (Barbi: Sirena)
- Barbie as Rapunzel (Barbi: Raperonzola)
- Barbie: Fairytopia (Barbi: Mariposa)
- Barbie of Swan Lake (Barbi e liqenit të mjellmave)
- Barbie in the 12 Dancing Princesses (Barbi: 12 princeshat kërcimtare)
- Barbie and the Magic of Pegasus (Barbi: Pegasus)
- Barbie as the Princess and the Pauper (Barbi: Princesha dhe varfanjakja)
- Beauty and the Beast (E bukura dhe bisha)
- Bratz: Rock Angelz (Bratz: Yjet e muzikës)
- Cinderella (Hirushja)
- Cinderella II: Dreams Come True (Hirushja II: Kur ëndrrat bëhen realitet)
- Cinderella III: A Twist in Time (Hirushja III: Loja e fatit)
- Dennis the Menace: Cruise Control (Denis harrakati: Kontrolli i lundrimit)
- Dinosaur Island Island (Ishulli i dinosaurëve)
- Dragon Ball Z: Dead Zone (Sferat e Dragoit: Zona e vdekjes)
- Dragon Ball Z: The World's Strongest (Sferat e Dragoit: Më i fuqishmi në botë)
- Finding Nemo (Në kërkim të Nemos)
- Flushed Away (Një mi në kanal)
- Groove Squad (Skuadra e jashtëzakonshme)
- Hercules (Herkuli)
- Hoodwinked! (Komploti i Kësulkuqes)
- Inspector Gadget's Last Case (Inspektori Gaxhet: Çështja e fundit)
- Madeline (Madalena)
- Skuadra spektakolare
- Globehunters: An Around the World in 80 Days Adventure (Rreth botës për 80 ditë)
- 20,000 Leagues Under the Sea (20,000 lega nën det)
- Ice Age (Epoka e akullnajave)
- Ice Age: The Meltdown (Epoka e akullnajave 2: Shkrirja)
- Sezoni i gjuetisë 2
- Lilo & Stitch (Lilo dhe Stiç)
- Madagascar (Madagaskar)
- Madagascar: Escape 2 Africa (Madagaskar 2: Arratisje në Afrikë)
- Meet the Robinsons (Takim me Robinsonët)
- Monsters, Inc. (Përbindëshat)
- Mulan
- Mulan II
- Over the Hedge (Pertej Gardhi)
- Peter Pan (Piter Pan)
- Pinocchio (Pinoku)
- Planet 51 (Planeti 51)
- Pocahontas (Pokahontas)
- Përtej gardhit
- The Jungle Book (Libri i Xhunglës)
- Vajza e xhunglës dhe ishulli i dinosaurëve
- Tristani dhe Izolda
- Konti i Monte-Kristos
- Return to Never Land (Piter Pan: Kthim në ishullin që nuk ekziston)
- Sabrina: Friends Forever (Sabrina: Shoqe përgjithmonë)
- Sinbad: Legend of the Seven Seas (Sinbad)
- Slepping Beauty (Bukuroshja e fjetur)
- Snow White and the Seven Dwarfs (Borëbardha dhe shtatë xhuxhat)
- Zorro (I mrekullueshmi Zorro)
- The Road to El Dorado (Rruga për El Dorado)
- The Lion King II: Simba's Pride (Mbreti luan II: Mbretëria e Simbës)
- The Little Mermaid (Sirena e vogël)
- The Little Mermaid II: Return to the Sea (Sirena e Vogël II: Kthim në thellësi)
- The Little Mermaid: Ariel's Beginning (Sirena e Vogël: Historia e Arielit)
- The Sword in the Stone (Shpata në gur)
- The Wild (Xhungla)
- Tinker Bell (Këmbora)
- Time Kid (Djali i kohës)
- Treasure Island (Ishulli i thesarit)
- Treasure Planet (Planeti i thesarit)
- Tom and Jerry: Shiver Me Whiskers (Tomi dhe Xherri: Piratët)
- Tom and Jerry: The Fast and the Furry (Tomi dhe Xherri: Gara e çmendur)
- Tom and Jerry: The Magic Ring (Tomi dhe Xherri: Unazë Magjike)
- Tom and Jerry: Blast Off to Mars (Tomi dhe Xheri: Nisja për në Mars)
- Toy Story (Bota e lodrave)
- Toy Story 2 (Bota e lodrave 2)
- Winx Club: The Secret of the Lost Kingdom (Winx Club: Sekreti i mbretërisë së humbur)
- Wubbzy's Big Movie (Film i Madh e Ubullit)
