= Fax News =

- Country: Albania

History
- Launched: 6 October 2017

Links
- Website: faxweb.al

Fax News is an Albanian news television channel first launched on October 6, 2017. The channel is available on the national digital radio-television network. It is also offered as part of a package plan by ISP provider Abcom, part of the Tring terrestrial platform and can be also streamed online.
