= One Albania =

Albanian telecommunications company

One Albania sh.a.
- Type: Private
- Industry: Telecommunications
- Predecessor: One Telecommunications; ALBtelecom
- Founded: 22 November 1995 (as Albanian Mobile Communications or AMC); 2015 (as Telekom Albania); 2020 (as One Telecommunications); 2023 (as One Albania)
- Headquarters: Tirana, Albania
- Products: Mobile Telephony; Wireless Broadband; Landlines; Internet Solutions; Mobile IPTV
- Revenue: €154 million (2023)
- Owner: 4iG
- Number of employees: 501-1,000
- Parent: 4iG
- Website: www.one.al

One Albania sh.a is a telecommunications company that operates in Albania. It was founded as Albanian Mobile Communications (or AMC) and was part of the COSMOTE Group since 2000. In 2015, the company joined the Deutsche Telekom group after which it was rebranded as Telekom Albania.

In September 2020, the company's name of registration changed from Telekom Albania to One Telecommunications, starting the transition to a new brand. In January 2023, Albtelecom and One merged as one company known as One Albania and as of March 2023 the new company has taken on the same brand as One Montenegro. In March 2023, One changed its formal registered name from One Telecommunications to One Albania.

The display name of One is One.al, though it might appear on some phones simply as Telekom.al or AMC.

== History ==
Logo of AMC 2006‒2015

Logo of Telekom Albania 2015‒2020

Logo of One Telecommunications 2020-2023

=== 1995–2015: Albanian Mobile Communications ===
Following the fall of the communist regime, Albania's fixed-line network operated by ALBtelecom was underdeveloped, leaving most of the population without access to a telephone and unable to support the country's need for modern communication. Because ALBtelecom couldn't install new copper wires fast enough to meet this sudden demand, on November 22, 1995, the Albanian government founded Albanian Mobile Communications, under ownership of the Ministry of Finance, to bypass the bottleneck of the underdeveloped fixed-line system and provide communication to citizens. AMC started commercial operations on May 25, 1996, thus being the first mobile operator in Albania. AMC held a monopoly on the Albanian mobile market for 5 years, from 1996 to 2001, when Vodafone Albania began commercial operations.

Instructed by Aleksandër Meksi, the team working on it was led by project manager Bashkim Kasa. To launch the network, AMC invested over $8 million in equipment sourced primarily by Alcatel. During its launch, AMC covered with GSM service the following cities: Shkodër, Lezhë, Krujë, Tiranë, Durrës, Lushnje, Fier, and Vlorë, because these cities were the ones with a bigger population and a higher telephone service demand.

==== Privatization of AMC ====
During its monopoly, AMC was struggling to operate because of the lack of capital it had, the 1997 civil war, and high prices (around 45,000 to 65,000 Albanian Lek in the 2000s, highest in Europe), which left it only at 11,000 customers. Because the state could not fund the nationwide expansion of AMC's GSM network, the Albanian government in the early 2000s began preparations to privatize AMC. On March 29, 2000, Mustafa Muçi was in London regarding the sale of 85% of AMC's shares. Four entities were interested in acquiring AMC:

- Telecom Italia & Mobilcom Austria
- Turkcell
- Cosmote & Telenor
- Panafon, Albatel & Vodafone consortium (which later submitted its offer under Panafon)

The acquisition tender opened on May 16, 2000. Turkcell offered $39 million USD, Panafon $40 million USD, and Cosmote-Telenor offered $85.6 million USD. Cosmote-Telenor were announced as the winners of the tender on August 23, 2000, acquiring 85% of AMC's stake, thus privatizing AMC.

The sale of AMC to a private investor led to the noticeable rise of the company, with cheaper tariffs and an upgraded network. AMC introduced Albakarta, a prepaid SIM card, which was designed to attract customers who did not want to sign monthly contracts. The launch of Albakarta surged AMC's subscriber base from 11,000 during the state-owned era to 273,000 in December 2001. Albakarta call rates were reduced to 24 ALL/minute, while SMS rates were lowered to 21 ALL/SMS in June 2001, representing a price reduction of 20%.

In 2005, its revenues exceeded €137 million. In 2007 AMC's revenues reached 176.2 million Euro, 16.7% higher on a yearly basis. The company's EBITDA grew by 20.1% in 2007 on a 62.0% margin, while net income increased by 22.1% year-on-year, with the net income margin at 34.6% for 2007. In 2011, AMC revenues stood at €119.3 million

AMC's 2G coverage improved significantly by December 2003, reaching 90% of the population and 80% of the country's territory. Wireless Internet was introduced a year later in 2004, followed by the rollout of MMS services in February 2005. In October 2005, AMC rebranded its visual layout to align with COSMOTE's corporate identity, becoming the first COSMOTE subsidiary to visually consolidate its position within the parent group.

In September 2007, AMC launched the "What's Up" prepaid brand, specifically dedicated to the youth and student demographic in Albania. By 2010–2011, AMC began transitioning its prepaid brand, What's Up, from simple billing to competitive weekly and monthly "add-on packages" containing bundled minutes, SMS, and data to remain competitive. Meanwhile, Albakarta remained in the market as the legacy prepaid option for the general public.

Alongside network upgrades, AMC expanded its value-added services by securing official partnerships with global digital platforms, including Deezer and Evernote. The company's corporate strategy also emphasized corporate social responsibility (CSR); between 2012 and 2013, AMC joined the ICT Coalition for a Safer Internet for Children and Young People, promoting digital safety in Albania. For its regional infrastructure investments and community initiatives, AMC was awarded the prize for "Business Excellence and Social Contribution" at the 5th annual InfoCom Conference in Tiranë in November 2012.

In October 2011, AMC acquired Albania's second 3G license for €15.1 million, outbidding Eagle Mobile which offered 12.9 million euros, and launching high-speed mobile internet services across major cities and extending coverage to 95% of the country by mid-2012. In March 2015, the company secured its 4G LTE license, with a downloading speed of 150 Mbit/s and upload speed of 50 Mbit/s.

On July 2nd, 2015, AMC announced that they would rebrand to the Telekom brand on July 23rd, 2015, marking the end of the AMC name & brand.

=== Telekom Albania Era (2015–2020) ===
Telekom Albania was officially introduced on July 23rd, 2015, as the successor of Albanian Mobile Communications and launched 4G at launch, and later launched 4G+ (LTE-Advanced) in September 2015.

The 2015 rebrand started a rivalry with ALBtelecom. Upon the launch of the new identity, ALBtelecom publicly threatened legal action through the National Registration Center (QKR) and the Albanian Competition Authority. ALBtelecom argued that the name "Telekom Albania" was an unlawful, inverted copy of "Albanian Telecom", the historic, state-owned identity that ALBtelecom still legally held rights to. However, the rebranding proceeded after Telekom Albania successfully established its formal compliance with existing commercial registry statutes. Then in February 2018, Telekom Albania publicly condemned a proposed draft regulation by AKEP, claiming it unfairly favored ALBtelecom's retail pricing models.

When Plus, the fourth-largest mobile network provider, ceased operations in Albania, Telekom Albania agreed to buy 50% of the frequencies that Plus used to operate, alongside Vodafone Albania.

The period between 2017 and 2018 marked a severe financial crisis for Telekom Albania, characterized by a sharp decline in revenues and net losses. In 2017, the operator recorded a net loss of 4.8 billion ALL (approximately €38 million), the first major loss in its corporate history. This financial downturn got heavier in 2018, with net losses reaching 5.4 billion ALL, driven primarily by declining international incoming traffic revenues and strict regulatory pricing adjustments. This crisis made OTE and Deutsche Telekom place the Albanian subsidiary up for sale in late 2018.

In January 2019, OTE announced an agreement to sell 100% of its shares in Telekom Albania for €50 million to Albania Telecom Invest AD, a joint venture between Bulgarian entrepreneur Spas Roussev and Albanian investor Elvin Guri. The acquisition was cleared from AKEP in early 2019, and the operator successfully went into financial profitability under the new management. In September 2019, One was awarded the 2×10 MHz frequency zone of 811 MHz-821 MHz/852 MHz-862 MHz by Electronic and Postal Communications Authority for 7.44 million euros.

In April 2020, Telekom Albania announced that Ericsson would modernize Telekom Albania's core & radio networks, where Ericsson would upgrade Telekom's network capabilities to Gigabit LTE class while also making the network 5G ready. This made Telekom Albania the first operator in Albania & the region to join the list of "The Clean Network" certification.

=== ONE Telecommunications era (2020–2023) ===
The Telekom era officially concluded in late July 2020, when the new ownership formally registered the change of the company's legal name to "ONE Telecommunications" and its commercial brand to ONE. This change was commercially applied on September 10, 2020, accompanied by a complete revamp of the company's brand identity, slogan, and retail stores.

To reverse market share losses from previous years and compete directly with rival Vodafone Albania, ONE Telecommunications implemented an aggressive commercial strategy centered on flat-rate "Unlimited" tariff packages, contract flexibility, and targeted youth offerings. This commercial push was combined with marketing campaigns highlighting independent technical evaluations; following its €92 million infrastructure overhaul with Ericsson, ONE was awarded network quality performance certifications in 2020 and 2021 by international auditor Umlaut (formerly P3).

These operational and marketing initiatives led to a significant recovery in active user figures. Official reports from the Electronic and Postal Communications Authority (AKEP) indicated that by the third quarter of 2021, ONE had expanded its active mobile subscriber base to approximately 1.1 million users, representing roughly 41% of the Albanian mobile market and effectively narrowing the competitive gap with long-time market leader Vodafone.

=== One Albania (2023-Today) ===
In December 2021, Hungarian technology and telecommunications firm 4iG Nyrt signed an agreement to acquire ONE Telecommunications from Albania Telecom Invest AD. Concurrently, 4iG finalized the acquisition of an 80.27% controlling stake in Albania's incumbent fixed-line operator, ALBtelecom.

On 10 March 2022, the Albanian Competition Authority approved the sale of ONE Telecommunication in favor of the Hungarian company 4iG. On 21 March, the company itself announced the acquisition of 99.899% indirect stakes in One Telecommunications. This is the second acquisition of a telecommunication company in the Albanian market, following that of ALBtelecom by 4iG, explaining that these two companies are complementary in the Albanian market.

Following regulatory clearance from AKEP and the Albanian Competition Authority, ONE Telecommunications and ALBtelecom were legally merged on January 1, 2023. In March 2023, the combined mobile and fixed entity adopted the unified commercial brand which is present today, One Albania sh.a, concluding the standalone ONE Telecommunications era.

After the commercial launch, One Albania started a full-scale operational and technical integration, combining ALBtelecom's fixed fiber-optic network with ONE's mobile infrastructure. This integration created Albania's largest fixed-mobile converged (FMC) telecommunications operator, enabling single-package offerings that combined mobile, fixed broadband, and television services. To modernize its fixed-line segment, the company launched a multi-year fiber-to-the-home (FTTH) network expansion under the "One Ultra Fiber" brand, replacing legacy copper DSL infrastructure.

The merger also established a tight market duopoly in Albania, with One Albania having about 1.25 million active/registered users alongside market rival Vodafone Albania, with approximately 1.24 million users.

On November 25, 2024, One Albania became the first mobile operator in the country to launch commercial 5G services, following frequency spectrum assignments by AKEP. One was awarded 120 MHz in the 3420-3540 MHz frequency band. Deployed in partnership with Ericsson, the 5G rollout expanded across major urban centers, including Tirana, Durrës, Elbasan, Vlorë, and Shkodër, and key tourism corridors.

== Market share ==
Albania as per Q2 2026 has 2.97 million subscribers, out of which there are approximately ~2.49 million active SIM cards, a penetration rate of 103.7%. An active user is the number of users that communicated in the last three months.

The regulatory authority for telecommunication in Albania is the Electronic and Postal Communications Authority.

Rank	Operator	Technology	Subscribers (in millions)	Ownership	MCC / MNC
1	One Albania • Includes the former ALBtelecom Mobile network.	GSM-900/1800 MHz (GPRS, EDGE) 2100 MHz UMTS, HSDPA, HSUPA, HSPA, HSPA+, DC-HSPA+ 800/1800/2600 MHz LTE, LTE-A VoLTE, LTE-A Pro 3420/3540 MHz 5G NR	1.25 (50.3%, Q2 2026)	4iG	27601 27603
2	Vodafone Albania	GSM-900/1800 MHz (GPRS, EDGE) 800/1800/2100/2600 MHz LTE, LTE-A, LTE-A Pro VoLTE 3670/3800 MHz 5G NR	1.24 (49.7%, Q2 2026)	Vodafone Group plc (99.9%)	27602

== Controversies ==
=== Privatization and initial pricing disputes (2000) ===
In August 2000, the Albanian government completed the privatization of state-owned Albanian Mobile Communications (AMC), selling an 85% controlling stake to Cosmote (a subsidiary of Greece's OTE) for $85.6 million. The transaction generated intense parliamentary and political debate in Albania regarding whether key strategic digital infrastructure had been sold below market value. Following the acquisition, AMC, as the sole active mobile network operator in Albania at the time, faced severe public criticism and opposition over subscription costs, high retail call tariffs, and network coverage limitations.

=== Mobile duopoly and antitrust penalties (2004–2007) ===
Throughout the mid-2000s, AMC and Vodafone Albania operated as a joint duopoly, controlling nearly 100% of the mobile telecommunications market prior to the market entry of third operator Eagle Mobile. On 9 November 2007, the Albanian Competition Authority released Decision No. 59 following an in-depth investigation covering market practices between 2004 and 2005. The authority ruled that both operators had abused their joint dominant position through excessive retail pricing, artificially elevated off-net call rates, high national termination tariffs, and restrictive interconnection agreements with fixed-line operator ALBtelecom. Consequently, the Competition Commission imposed a fine on both companies equal to 2% of their annual turnovers in the relevant market.

=== Ownership transfer, Telekom Srbija bid, and national security scrutiny (2018–2019) ===
In late 2018, parent company Deutsche Telekom initiated the sale of its 99.79% controlling stake in Telekom Albania. Serbian state-owned operator Telekom Srbija submitted the highest financial offer to acquire the company, bidding €61 million. The prospect of a Serbian state-controlled entity acquiring Albania's second-largest mobile operator triggered significant geopolitical pushback and national security concerns in Tirana.

In October 2018, Albanian Prime Minister Edi Rama publicly opposed the transaction, stating that while private Serbian investments were welcome, the takeover of strategic digital infrastructure by a Serbian state enterprise was "not the preference" of the Albanian government. Despite diplomatic exchanges involving Serbian President Aleksandar Vučić, the Albanian government's opposition effectively disqualified Telekom Srbija's bid regardless of its higher monetary value.

In January 2019, Deutsche Telekom accepted a lower bid of €50 million from Albania Telecom Invest AD, a corporate vehicle controlled by Bulgarian businessman Spas Roussev and Albanian-Bulgarian investor Elvin Guri. The transaction underwent heightened regulatory scrutiny regarding ultimate beneficial ownership transparency, foreign capital influence, and national security surrounding critical infrastructure.

=== Coordinated package restructuring and 28-day billing cycle (2020) ===
In early 2020, ONE Telecommunications and Vodafone Albania simultaneously altered the validity period of their monthly prepaid bundles from 30 days to 28 days, effectively creating a 13th billing period per calendar year while increasing package rates. The synchronized pricing structure caused public controversy and consumer complaints to regulatory bodies. The Competition Authority intervened, launching an investigation into potential tacit collusion and ordering operators to adjust retail package terms.

=== 4iG acquisition and market consolidation concerns (2021–2023) ===
Between late 2021 and 2022, Hungarian information technology and telecommunications firm 4iG acquired both ALBtelecom and ONE Telecommunications. In January 2023, 4iG legally merged ALBtelecom and ONE Telecommunications into a single entity, launching the unified brand ONE Albania in March 2023. Economic analysts and political figures expressed concerns regarding market over-consolidation, as the merger created a near-monopoly in fixed landline/broadband infrastructure and established a tight duopoly alongside Vodafone Albania in the mobile sector.

=== Network migration collapse and AKEP sanction (2023–2024) ===
Following the legal merger of ALBtelecom and ONE Telecommunications, ONE Albania executed a major migration of its core network infrastructure and billing management systems during mid-2023. The integration experienced severe technical failures, resulting in nationwide service blackouts, dropped calls, mobile data outages, delayed number porting, and automated billing errors. Following an official inspection, the Electronic and Postal Communications Authority (AKEP) issued Decision No. 4, imposing a 10 million ALL administrative fine on ONE Albania.

=== Parallel price alignment and market restriction directives (2026) ===
In July 2026, following an investigation into market practices and parallel price movements, the Competition Authority issued binding regulatory mandates against both ONE Albania and Vodafone Albania. The authority determined that operators restricted consumer access to cheaper plans in physical retail outlets, imposed contractual switching barriers, and failed to provide affordable packages for vulnerable demographics. The regulator ordered ONE Albania and Vodafone to introduce dedicated low-cost packages for pensioners and students within 90 days, ensure lower-tier plans are accessible in physical stores, remove penalties for post-contract plan downgrades, and undergo one year of strict compliance monitoring.

== See also ==
- List of mobile network operators of Europe
- Vodafone
- ALBtelecom Mobile
- Plus
