= Plus Communication =

Albanian telecommunication company

Plus Communication Sh.A
- Industry: Telecommunications
- Founded: June 10, 2009
- Defunct: January 1, 2018
- Headquarters: Tirana, Albania
- Area served: Albania
- Services: Telecommunications
- Number of employees: 312 (2016)
- Website: plus.al

PLUS ALBANIA Communication SH.A. (also known as PLUS) was an Albanian telecommunications company. It was the 4th largest mobile operator in Albania by number of subscribers.

== Opening ==
PLUS Communication was founded in June 2009, after AKEP gave the Individual Authorization (license) as the bidder with the highest value, to provide mobile telephony services. The company started its commercial operations on December 6, 2010. When PLUS ceased operations in 2018, its reserved frequencies were split between Vodafone and One.

== Market share ==
In 2012, PLUS had 5.3 million subscribers (187% penetration rate), out of which there were 3.2 million active users (114% penetration rate). An active user is defined as having communication in the last three months.

The regulatory authority for telecommunication in Albania is the Electronic and Postal Communications Authority.

| Rank | Operator | Technology | Subscribers (in millions) | Ownership |
|---|---|---|---|---|
| 1 | Vodafone | GSM-900/1800; UMTS, HSPA, HSPA+, 4G, 4G+, 5G NR | 1.839 or 34.76% (2012) | Vodafone |
| 2 | One Albania | GSM-900/1800; UMTS, HSPA, HSPA+, 4G, 4G+, 5G NR | 1.736 or 32.82% (2012) | 4iG |
| 3 | ALBtelecom Mobile | GSM-900/1800; UMTS, HSPA, HSPA+, 4G, 4G+ | 1.304 or 24.66% (2012) | Albtelecom |
| 4 | Plus | GSM-900/1800 | 0.410 or 7.76% (2012) | Plus Communication |

== See also ==
- List of mobile network operators of Europe
- Vodafone
- Telekom
- Albtelecom
