= Daigunder =

Japanese anime television series

- Promotional artwork for Daigunder featuring several important characters.

爆闘宣言ダイガンダー (Bakutō Sengen Daigandā)
- Anime television series
- Directed by: Hiroyuki Yano
- Written by: Shinzō Fujita
- Music by: Yasunori Iwasaki
- Studio: Brain's Base
- Original network: TXN (TV Tokyo)
- English network: AU: Seven Network; CA: Family Channel (Power Box); IE: RTÉ2; NZ: TVNZ 2; SEA: Animax; UK: Fox Kids/Jetix, Five, Kix; US: ABC Family
- Original run: April 5, 2002 – December 27, 2002
- Episodes: 39

Daigunder (爆闘宣言ダイガンダー, Bakutō Sengen Daigandā) is a Japanese anime television series about humans using robots in tournaments. Created by Nihon Ad Systems and Takara and animated by Brain's Base, the studio's first television production, the series aired on TV Tokyo and its affiliates from April to December 2002. A series of Daigunder toys were produced that could interact with TV screens.

== Plot ==
Set in a futuristic time where talking robots are common, there is a tournament where robot teams pit off against each other in. The Battle Robots look like humans and transforming animals.

A boy named Akira Akebono plans to win the Titan Belt with his robots Bulion, Eaglearrow, Drimog, Bonerex, Despector, Trihorn, Ryugu and also Daigu who form the mighty Daigunder. The Daigunder unit was a creation of Akira's grandfather Professor Hajime Akebono. Managed by a girl named Haruka Hoshi, Team Akira enters many tournaments for Akira to reach his goal. However, there are many occasions when a Battle Robot named Ginzan is out to destroy Daigunder. Ginzan does this under the orders of the evil and mysterious Professor Maelstrom and he is later joined by Tigamaru and Rogamaru. Akira and his friends soon find a new ally in DragonBurst and new comrades in his assistants DragonFlame and DragonFreezer.

== Characters ==
=== Team Akira ===
Akira and his robots' base of operations is Dailand and they get around in their plane called the Daishuttle. Team Akira's Battle Robots consist of the Daigunder Unit (Ryugu, Daigu, DragonFlame and DragonFreezer), the Animal Unit (Bulion, Eaglearrow and Drimog), and the Dino Unit (Bonerex, Despector and Trihorn). When damaged, Sabuto gives them upgrades whenever they need it.

Akira Akebono (曙アキラ)
Voiced by: Fujiko Takimoto (Japanese); Barbara Goodson (English)

The Commander of Team Akira, Akira is the grandson of famed Battle Robot creator Hajime Akebono. His dreams of winning the Titan Belt lead him to compete or the Battle Robot Tournament. He challenges other teams with his group of robots. His most powerful and trusted ones is Ryugu and Daigu. The first robot of Team Akira was Bulion (also Hajime's first creation), who Akira played with even as a child.

Haruka Hoshi/Heruka (星ハルカ/ヘルカ)
Voiced by: Juri Ihata (Japanese); Lara Jill Miller (English)

Haruka Hoshi (initially spelled Haruka in the closed captioning, then changed to "Heruka" [sic] to match the English pronunciation) is a young girl who looking to become a manager of Team Akira & a Battle Robots team. After Team Akira defeats Team John & gains a Battle Robot License, she becomes Akira's manager & helps to tune up his robots.

Hajime Akebono (ハジメ博士)
Voiced by: Tomohisa Asō (Japanese); Steve Blum (English)

Hajime Akebono is a scientist who is Akira's grandfather. He is a famous Battle Robot Creator who created the robots that Akira uses, including DragoBurst along with Professor Maelstrom but DragonFlame, DragonFreezer and DragoBurst have gone berserk and gone against them years ago. Hajime later made the Animal Unit (made up of Bulion, Eaglearrow and Drimog) and then the Dino Unit (made up of Bonerex, Despector and Trihorn) and eventually the Cluster System, which is made up of Ryugu and Daigu, who combine to form Daigunder. He likes to travel to different places. Bulion was Hajime's first powerful battle robot.

Beebot (サボット, Sabotto)

A small robot that does the maintenance on Team Akira's robots.

==== Daigunder/Dragon Unit ====
A creation of Professor Hajime, Battle King Daigunder (爆闘王ダイガンダー, Bakutō ō Daigandā; Explosive War King Daigunder) is the Metamorphic Fusion of Ryugu and Daigu. Nicknamed the "King of the Battle Robots", he was equipped with special system called the Cluster System. Daigunder can attack his enemies with his Dragon Cannon (his finisher) and Dragon Sword. With Despector as his left arm he can perform the Echo Blast. When Both DragonFlame and DragonFreeze weapon use with Daigunder, it can use its most powerful attack, the Dragon Buster. He can also combine with DragoBurst.

Flaming Robot Warrior Ryugu (燃える竜騎士リューグ; Burning Dragon Knight Ryugu)
Voiced by: Yuki Kaida (Japanese); Joshua Seth (English)

Ryugu is Akira's constant companion and as stubborn as he is. At first he refuses to obey Akira, until he sees Akira protect him. His attacks are Knight Slash and Knight Quake. Ryugu is a small knight robot.

Daigu (白き不沈艦ガンダー; White Unsinkable Ship Gunder)
Voiced by: Kiyoyuki Yanada (Japanese); Michael Sorich (English)

Daigu never fights unless fused with either Ryugu, Bulion or Bonerex. While he most often all he says is "Daigu!" he has spoken other words on occasion. He is a dragon robot.

Magma-Born Hot-blooded warrior DragonFlame (マグマが生んだ熱血剣士ドラゴフレイム)
Voiced by: Susumu Chiba

Part of the Daigunder Unit. One of two robots built by Professors Hajime and Maelstrom when they were partners. After finding out about Big Bang's true motives, DragonFlame and DragonFreezer ran off with their leader DragoBurst on a space station in outer space. Later on in the series, they joined Team Akira. DragonFlame's animal is a Fire Dragon and attacks with Magma Dynamic. DragonFlame can Armor Fuse and become a sword by saying Saber Change for either DragoBuster or Daigunder. Like Daigu, DragonFlame mostly says one word "Flame!" DragonFlame can also combine with DragonFreezeer to become a kind of two-headed dragon for Daigunder to ride on for flight.

Blizzard-Born Cold-blooded Sage DragonFreezer (吹雪が生んだ冷血賢者ドラゴフリーザ)
Voiced by: Nobutoshi Canna

Part of the Daigunder Unit. One of two robots built by Professors Hajime and Maelstrom when they were partners. After finding out about Big Bang's true motives, DragonFreezer and DragonFlame ran off with their leader DragoBuster on a space station in outer space. Later on in the series, they joined Team Akira. DragonFreezer's animal is an Ice Dragon and attacks with Blizzard Strike. DragonFreezer can Armor Fuse by saying Shield Change and become a shield for either DragoBuster or Daigunder. Like Daigu and DragonFlame, DragonFreezer mostly says one word "Freeze!" DragonFreezer can also combine with DragonFlame to become some kind of two-headed dragon for Daigunder to ride on for flight.

==== Bulion ====
Voiced by: Tetsu Inada (Japanese); Bob Papenbrook (English)

Blue Thrasher Bulion (蒼き稲妻ブライオン, Blue Lightning Bulion) is the Leader of Team Akira's Animal Unit and attacks with his Thunder Claw attack. His animal form is a lion. He can Metamorphic Fuse with Daigu to become Battle King Daigulion (格闘王ダイガライオン, Grappling King Daigulion) who attacks with his "Thunder Fang Battle Claw". With Eaglearrow and Drimog on his arms he can perform the Daigulion Blaster, and his finisher is "Thunder Fang Battle Claw". Bulion could also Armor Fuse with DragonBurst to become Black Lightning Burstlion (黒き稲妻バーストライオン).

==== Bonerex ====
Voiced by: Ryotaro Okiayu (Japanese); Paul Schrier (English)

Jurassic Soldier Bonerex (ジュラシックソルジャーボーンレックス) is the leader of the Dino Unit who attacked the mayor's town when the mayor was placing an amusement park in the Dino Units area. He and the Dino Unit later joined Akira and attacks with his Bone Blade attack. His animal form is a Tyrannosaurus. He can Metamorphic Fuse with Daigu to become the Swordplay King Daigarex (剣闘王ダイガレックス), with attacks such as the Air-Slicing Beast Sword and Daigurex Fire, which he performs with Despector and Trihorn on his arms. Bonerex can also Armor Fuse with DragoBurst to form Jurassic Darkness Burstrex (ジュラシックダークバーストレックス).

==== Megarex ====
Incredible Quadruple Robot Megarex (衝撃の4体駆動メガベックス, Four Body Force Shockwave Megavex) is the Power Fusion of Eaglearrow, Drimog, Despector, and Trihorn. This combination is seldom used, as it sometimes takes a lot of power out of them. Eaglearrow forms the chest armor. Drimog forms the lower torso and legs. Despector forms the back and wings. Trihorn forms the head, upper torso, arms and feet. Megarex is powerful enough to withstand Ginzan's Power Blast attack.

Descending Disaster Eaglearrow (甦るウィリアム・テルイーグルアロー, Resurrection of William Tell Eaglearrow)
Voiced by: Isshin Chiba (Japanese); Richard Epcar (English)

Member of the Animal Unit. He is one of the fliers of Team Akira since his animal form is an eagle. Constantly argues with Drimog. Attacks with Fire Arrow.

Underground Fighter Drimog (縁の下の暴れん坊ドリモーグ, Wild Child Under the Edge Drimog)
Voiced by: Masaya Onosaka (Japanese); Steve Kramer (English)

Member of the Animal Unit who can dig underground. His animal form is a mole and he constantly argues with Eaglearrow. Attacks with Crash Burn.

Dark Reaper Despecter (死神貴族デスペクター, Aristocratic God of Death Despector)
Voiced by: Kōichi Tōchika (Japanese); Lex Lang (English)

Member of the Dino Unit that joins Team Akira. One of Team Akira's fliers. His animal form is a Pteranodon. Attacks with Specter Slash.

Gate Keeper Trihorn (怪力門番トライホーン, Super-Strong Gate Keeper Trihorn)
Voiced by: Isshin Chiba (Japanese); Lex Lang (English)

Member of the Dino Unit that joins with Akira. He can be a bit dumb at times. His animal form is a Triceratops. Attacks with Horn Strike.

=== Allies ===
Commissioner Spinklestarber (コミッショナー)
Voiced by: Keiichi Sonobe (Japanese); Joey D'Auria (English)

Commissioner Spinklestarber is the person in the Battle Robots Tournament who observes all tournaments. A running gag is that Akira cannot seem to get his name right.

Mysterious Unallied Gunman Ginzan (敵か味方か謎のガンマンギンザン)
Voiced by: Susumu Chiba (Japanese); Tom Wyner (English)

A Battle Robot who worked for the mysterious Professor Maelstrom that attacked Daigunder on different occasions, nicknaming himself the "Ultimate Battle Robot". Although an enemy to Team Akira initially, he did team up with Akira and the Daigunder Unit for an Armor Fusion on some occasions like getting out of a cavern with sentient acidic liquid, subduing an out of control Battle Robot, and helping to find an abducted king. Ginzan can combine with Daigunder for an attack called "Dragon Revolver". The "Dragon Revolver" is one of the most powerful attacks, best remembered for almost destroying DragonFlame and DragonFreeze in space. Yet another notable Dragon Revolver attack was on Sacred Steel Tortoise, as it was successful in piercing its powerful shield. After learning about honor from Daigunder, he has begun to switch sides and eventually betrayed Professor Maelstrom when he learned his true intentions and how he felt that robots were merely tools. After fighting against Daigunder with Akira as his commander as part of a test, Ginzan decides to go away for a while and perhaps someday join Team Akira, as he now considers Akira his new commander. His animal form is a winged unicorn, his attacks include Spin Revolver and his best attack is Ultimate Revolver which forms the face of a Unicorn during its attack. After Maelstrom changed his ways, Ginzan returned to him along with Tigamaru and Rougamaru.

Dark Beast of Legend DragoBurst, Battle Emperor DragonBurst (伝説の暗黒獣ドラゴバースト)
Voiced by: Norio Wakamoto

A robot built by Professors Hajime and Deikun when they were friends and partners. After finding out about Maelstrom's true motives, he ran off and now he lives with his two companions DragonFlame and DragonFreezer on a space station in outer space. His ultimate goal is to get Daigunder on his team, destroy humanity and thereby establish a Robot Utopia. He can Armor Fuse with Daigunder to form Legendary Battle Warrior Dragon Daigunder (伝説の爆闘神ドラゴンダイガンダー) with DragoFlame as a sword and DragoFreezer as a shield and attacks with his Burst Cannon and Dragon Nova. After some talking-to from Akira and Daigunder, DragoBurst realized the truth about humans and helped Team Akira destroy Maelstrom's giant turtle robot using the power of the Cluster System. His animal form is a Black Dragon and attacks with Buster Black Hole and Energy Fist. He is also capable of hypnotizing robots with his "Dragon Wave".

=== Villains ===
Professor Maelstrom/Big Bang (プロフェッサー・ビッグバン)
Voiced by: Kiyoyuki Yanada

The primary antagonist of the series. Professor Maelstrom was once Professor Hajime's friend and partner when he was originally known as Professor Deikun/Daikun. Together they built DragoBurst. When DragoBurst found out that Professor Deikun planned to use him to take over the world, he fired at him thus destroying the laboratory and left. Many years later, he has returned complete with a metal eye due to the accident. He built Ginzan, Tigamaru, and Rogamaru to defeat Daigunder for unknown purposes especially world domination due to Daigunder is creation of his former friend Professor Hajime. After Dragon Daigunder destroyed his ultimate Battle Robot, he changed his ways. His most powerful robotic invention was the "Sacred Steel Tortoise" as he thought it was the destined end of Daigunder and Dragonburst.

Maneuvering Pirate Tigamaru (機動大盗賊タイガマル)
Voiced by: Nobutoshi Canna (Japanese); Michael McConnohie (English)

One of two robots who join up with Ginzan to destroy Daigunder. He, along with Rogamaru, often uses trickery and deceit in their schemes to defeat Daigunder. He can combine with Rogamaru to form Maneuvering 2-Sword Style Double Fang (機動二刀流ダブルファング) with either of them at the top. Tigamaru's animal form is a tiger. Tigamaru's attack is the Tiga Whirldwind Slicer.

Maneuvering Ninja Scroll Rogamaru (機動忍法帳ロウガマル)
Voiced by: Nobuyuki Hiyama (Japanese); Brad MacDonald (English)

One of two robots who join up with Ginzan to destroy Daigunder. He, along with Tigamaru, often uses trickery and deceit in their schemes to defeat Daigunder. He can combine with Tigamaru to form Maneuvering 2-Sword Style Double Fang (機動二刀流ダブルファング) with either of them at the top. Rogamaru's animal form is a wolf. Rogamaru's attack is the Loga Moon Slicer.

== Episodes ==
1. The Dream Begins
2. Step One
3. Training Battle
4. Hybrid Match
5. Enter Ginzan
6. Robot Round Up
7. Bots Will Be Bots
8. There Is No "I" In Team
9. Been There, Done That
10. Friend or Foe
11. Battling with Style
12. Loose as a Caboose
13. The Mystery of Team X
14. The Enemy Within
15. Too Many Robots Spoil The Broth
16. A Royal Pain
17. Brits, Bots and Betty
18. A New Friend
19. Two Bots or Not Two Bots?
20. Goon With The Wind
21. Fight or Get Off The Bot
22. A Battle Down Memory Lane
23. Fire and Ice
24. The Stand in the Sand
25. Maelstrom's Madness
26. Daigunder My Thumb
27. The Battle for Ryugu
28. Maybe the Grass Ain't Greener
29. Dazed and Karnfused
30. Teamwork
31. A Lesson Earned is a Lesson Learned
32. Doctor Bridget Explains it All
33. Desperate Trap for Daigunder/A Kinder Gentler Side of Rogamaru and Tygamaru
34. Maelstrom vs. Dragon Burst/Saving Daigunder
35. History of the Title Grosser
36. Charge! Fight for the Hard Foughted
37. Assault Declaration! Dark Beast's Secret Fortress
38. Explosion Declaration! The Last Day of Dailand
39. Future Declaration! Matchless Cluster Power/Endgame

== Cast ==
=== Japanese Cast ===
- Fujiko Takimoto as Akira
- Juri Ihata as Haruka
- Yuki Kaida as Ryugu
- Kiyoyuki Yanada as Daigu/Daigunder
- Isshin Chiba as Eaglearrow & Trihorn
- Kazuhiro Nakata as Boss
- Keiichi Sonobe as Announcer
- Kōichi Tōchika as Despector
- Masaya Onosaka as Drimog
- Nobutoshi Canna as Taigamaru
- Nobuyuki Hiyama as Rougamaru
- Norio Wakamoto as Dragonburst
- Ryotaro Okiayu as Bone Rex/Daigurex
- Susumu Chiba as Ginzan
- Tetsu Inada as Bulion/Daigulion
- Tomohisa Asou as Dr. Hajime

=== English Cast ===
- Steve Blum – Professor Hajime Akebono
- Joey D'Auria – Commissioner Spinklestarber
- Richard Epcar – Eaglearrow
- Barbara Goodson – Akira Akebono
- Steve Kramer – Drimog
- Lex Lang – Despector, Tri-Horn
- Brad MacDonald – Rogamaru/Wolf Fang
- Dave Mallow – Track Announcer
- Michael McConnohie – Tigamaru/Tiger Fang
- Lara Jill Miller – Haruka Hoshi
- Bob Papenbrook – Bulion/Daigulion
- Paul Schrier – Bone Rex/Daigurex
- Joshua Seth – Ryugu
- Michael Sorich – Daigu/Daigunder
- Tom Wyner – Ginzan

==== Additional voices ====
- Mona Marshall – Makoto
- Jason C. Miller –
- Philece Sampler – Dr. Bridget (in "Brits, Bots, and Betty")
- Brianne Siddall – Jimmy (in "A New Friend")
- Kari Wahlgren -

== Crew ==
=== English Crew ===
- Tony Oliver – Producer
- Scott Page-Pagter – Voice Director

== Theme Songs ==
- "Bakuto Sengen! Daigunder" by Masaaki Endoh (OP)
- "We Are the Heroes" by Hiroshi Kitadani (ED)

== Home media ==
The entire series has been released as a 10-volume VHS in Japan by Nippon Columbia. The series has not been released in DVD or available digitally at Amazon Japan or Hulu. Three DVD volumes covering episodes 1-9 were released in Australia and New Zealand by Jetix.

== International Broadcast ==
Country	Channel	Season Premiere	Original Title
Japan	TV Tokyo	April 5, 2002	爆闘宣言ダイガンダー
Albania	Tring Tring	2011	Daigander
Bulgaria	Jetix	2004	Дайгундър
Canada	Family Channel	2002	Daigunder
Croatia	Nova TV	March 2007	Daigunder
Finland	Jetix (2004); MTV3 (7 May - 17 September 2005); Subtv Juniori (March 2005)	October 2004	Daigunder
France	Jetix; TF1	April 3, 2004	Daigunder
Germany	RTL II	October 11, 2003	Daigunder
Greece	Jetix	2005	Νταϊγκούντερ
Hungary	Jetix	2004	Daigunder
Israel	Jetix	2004	דאיגאנדר
Italy	Jetix; Italia 1	2004	Daigunder
New Zealand	TVNZ 2	2003	Daigunder
Norway	Jetix	2004	Daigunder
Poland	Jetix	2005	Daigunder
Portugal	SIC	2003	Daigunder
Romania	Antena 1	August 14, 2004	Daigunder
Spain	Antena 3	April 5, 2003	Daigunder
Sweden	Jetix	2004	Daigunder
Turkey	Kanal D	September 11, 2004	Daigunder
United Kingdom	Fox Kids/Jetix; Five; Kix	2002	Daigunder
United States	ABC Family	2002	Daigunder
