= Fatos Baxhaku =

Albanian journalist (1964–2019)

- Born: January 9, 1964; Tirana, PR Albania
- Died: August 16, 2019 (aged 55); Tirana, Albania
- Occupations: Journalist, publicist, lecturer
- Known for: Work in independent journalism in post-communist Albania

Fatos Baxhaku (9 January 1964 – 16 August 2019) was an Albanian journalist, publicist, and university lecturer. He was considered one of the pioneers of Albania's independent press in the early 1990s. Known for his in-depth written and televised reportages, Baxhaku was also a historian, a documentary author, and a critic of Albania's post-communist transition.

== Biography ==
=== Early life and education ===
Fatos Baxhaku was born in Tirana on 9 January 1964. He attended the "Emin Duraku" and "20 Vjetori" primary schools (today "Dora D'Istria"), and later the "Ismail Qemali" high school. Between 1982 and 1986, he studied history at the Faculty of History and Philology at the University of Tirana.

From 1986 to 1992, he worked at the Institute of History of the Albanian Academy of Sciences. He then began his journalism career, serving as editor-in-chief and journalist for Gazeta Shqiptare (1993–1998), and as the first news editor at Klan TV (1998–1999). He continued as editor-in-chief of the weekly magazine XXL (1999–2000), and later worked at Vizion Plus (2001–2005) and the daily Shqip (2006–2015). After 2015, he worked as a freelance journalist.

== Work ==
Baxhaku was the author or co-author of numerous television reportages and documentaries, including:

- Tuneli (Vizion Plus)
- Rrugëtim (Top Channel)
- Shtëpia e Vjetër (Digitalb)

He also lectured in journalism at the University of Elbasan and the University of Tirana.

He was a member of the Albanian Helsinki Committee and collaborated on training projects with organizations such as the Soros Foundation, USAID, the Albanian Media Institute, and the OSCE.

== Books ==
- Die Stammmesgesellschaften Nordalbaniens, co-authored with Karl Kaser, Vienna, 1996
- Gur, 2008 – A collection of written reportages
- Në Mirditë & rreth e rrotull, 2009
- Roje, 2010
- Çadra e kuqe: histori fatesh austro-shqiptare në shekujt XIX–XXI, 2013
- Gra të përgjithshme, co-authored with Klodiana Kapo, 2014
