= Faculty of Law, University of Tirana =

Faculty of the University of Tirana

- Fakulteti i Drejtësisë, Universiteti i Tiranës
- Type: Faculty of Public university. Study levels offered: Bachelor, Master, Doctorate
- Established: 1954
- Endowment: Financed by the Government of Albania
- Dean: Prof. Dr. Artan Hoxha
- Students: 5,000
- Location: Tirana, Albania
- Campus: suburban
- Colors: red and black
- Website: www.fdut.edu.al

The Faculty of Law of the University of Tirana is one of six faculties of the University of Tirana. Being the premier law school in the country, and one of the oldest higher education institutions in the country, it conducts both undergraduate and post-graduate degree programs in the field law.

== History ==
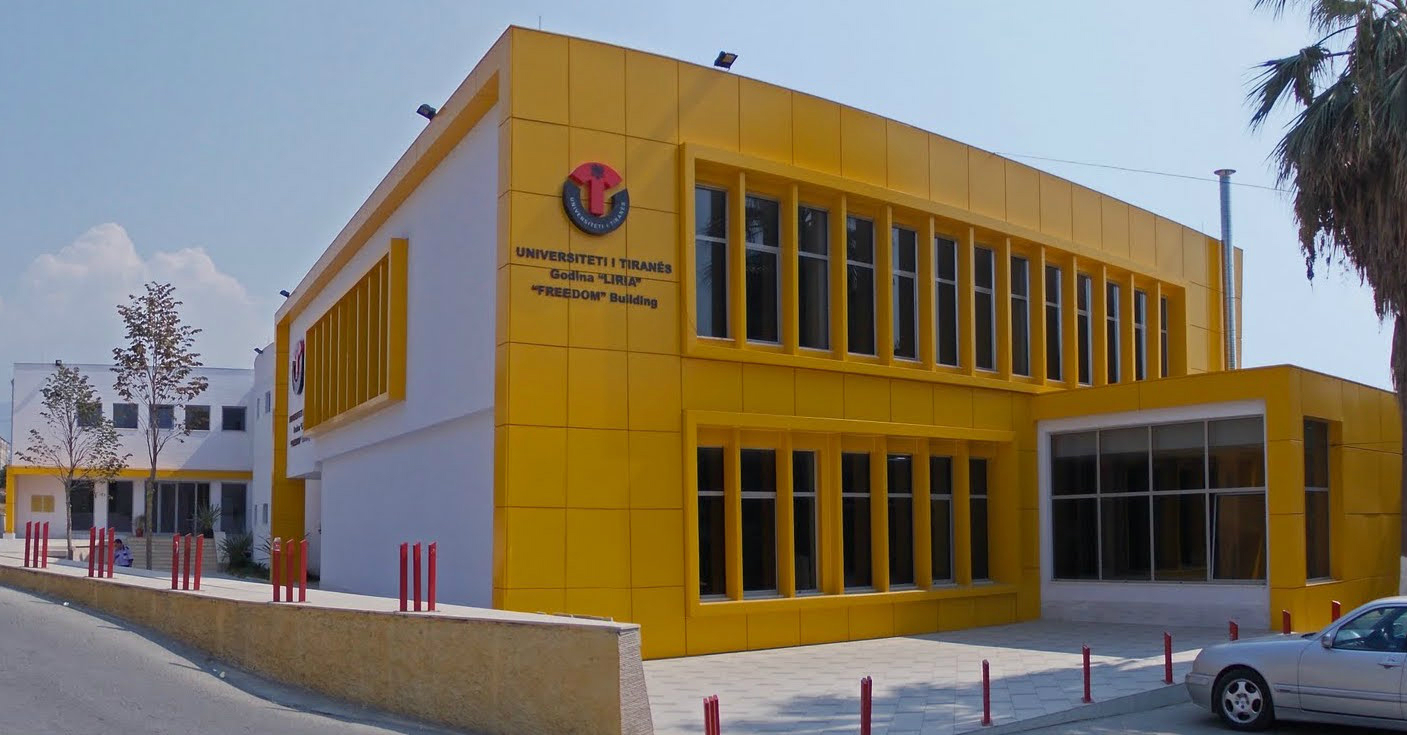
The façade of the Faculty of Law, University of Tirana

The Faculty of Law was established in 1954 as the "High Institute for Legal Studies". After the establishment of the State University of Tirana, the High Institute for Legal Studies was incorporated into the wider university structure as one of seven faculties, and renamed as the 'Faculty of Law. In 1965, the university was once again reorganized and the Faculty of Law was merged with the Department of Political Science, to form a bigger "Faculty of Political Science and Law". The new faculty sought to prepare specialists in political science, who were to serve as civil servants for the central and local organs of government and legal specialists, to serve in the judiciary and prosecution service. In 1967, the Faculty opened journalism course, which was to prepare journalists for the government-owned newspapers and for the newly established Albanian Radio and Television.

During the 1970s, the faculty was again reorganized, with the courses of political science transferred to a newly created department and philosophy brought under the ambit of the Faculty. In 1991, the faculty was renamed as the "Faculty of Law" once again, to reflect the fact that law degrees and philosophy were divided into two separate faculties, while the journalism degree was transferred to the Faculty of History and Philology.

Until the 1970s, the normal duration of studies was four years, but later it was reduced to three years of study, followed by a year of practical training in the courts. In the 1980s, the faculty returned to the four year study system. The most dramatic changes occurred after the fall of communism in Albania in 1991. The arrival of new concepts dealing with democracy, the rule of law and equality before the law, necessitated deep reforms in the academic and educational conception of the law and of the role of the lawyer. Thus, starting from 1991 the curriculum was developed according to Western models, and after 2000 there were efforts to transition the degrees offered by the Faculty to the Bologna process, thus now the Faculty of Law offers Bachelor of laws, Master of laws and PhD in Law degrees.

The Deans of the Faculty of Law throughout the years are as follows:

- Luan Omari,
- Zija Xholi,
- Ismail Lleshi,
- Kudret Çela (first term),
- Valentina Zaçe,
- Kudret Çela (second term),
- Ksenofon Krisafi,
- Vasilika Hysi,
- Kudret Çela (third term),
- Altin Shegani,
- Artan Hoxha.

== Enrollment ==
In recent years, the number of admissions to the Faculty of Law has grown substantially, with the Faculty of Law being attended by a total of 5000 students in its three levels of study. In order to be accepted, students must have completed the Matura Shtetërore and win a place in the Acceptance Examinations, which are held every year in September.
