= Juliana Latifi =

Albanian professor and judge

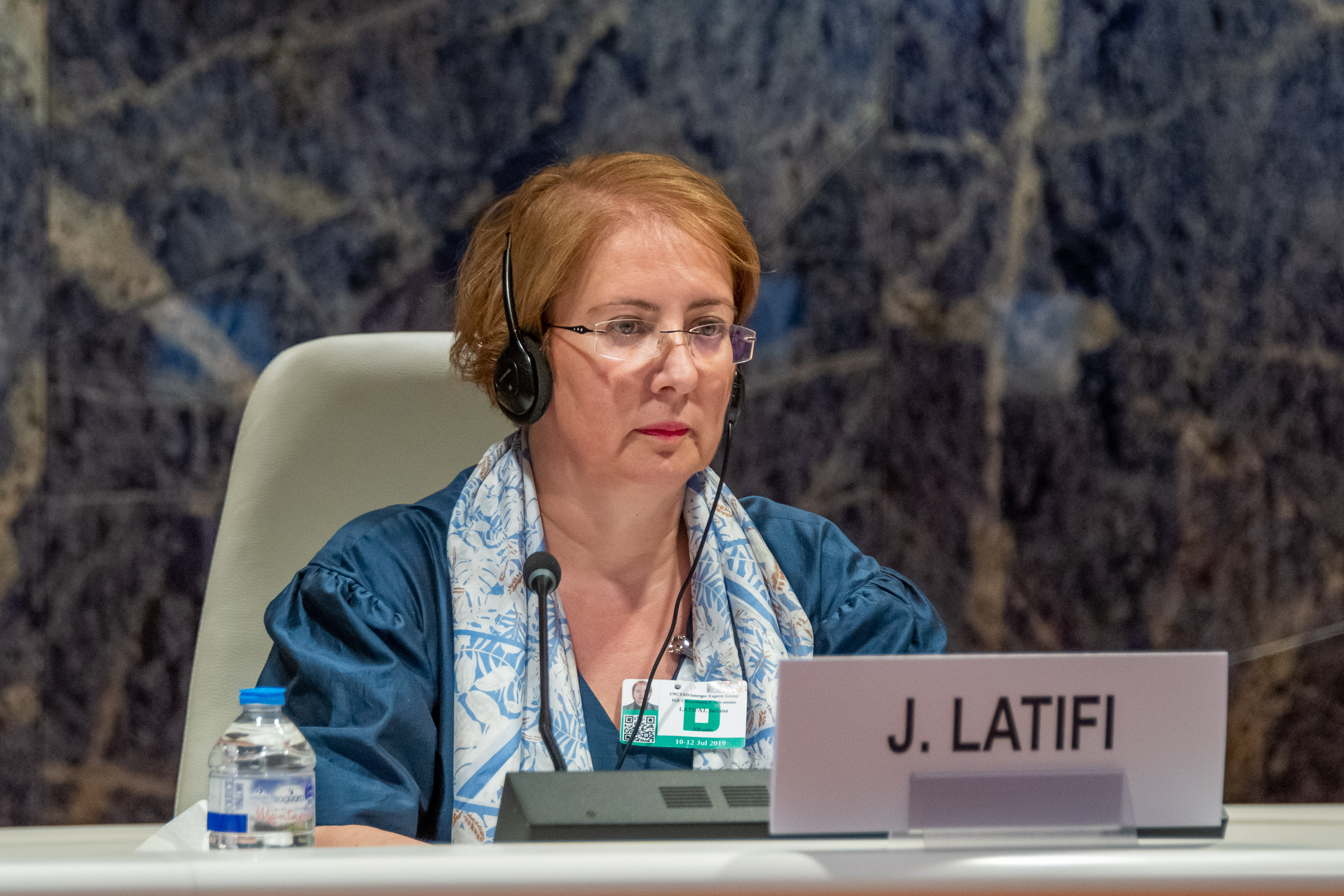
- Education: University of Tirana
- Occupation: Judge

Juliana Latifi is an Albanian professor, judge and chair of Albania's Competition Authority.

== Life ==
Latifi graduated in Law from the University of Tirana in 1991 and in 1997 she completed her doctorate at the same institution. From 2000 to 2002 she was completing post doc work at the Robert Schuman University in Strasbourg.

Latifi was appointed by the government in 2016 to lead Albania's Competition Authority. She took over from Lindita Milo who had served her five-year term of office. Latifi was proposed for the role by 28 members of parliament and she will serve for five years. At the end of 2019 she announced that the Competition Authority was taking over control of pharmaceuticals after an investigation of hospital management.

Latifi is a well paid public official and in 2020 she was amongst ministers, members of parliaments and senior justice department officials who agreed to take 50% wage cut to help fund the country's contribution to the cost of the COVID-19 pandemic.
