= Arben Bajraktaraj =

French actor of Albanian descent (born 1973)

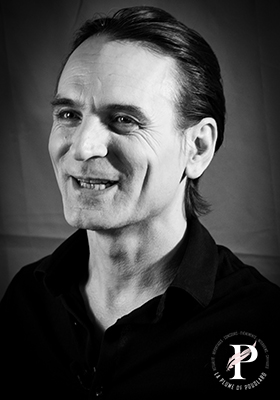
- Arben Bajraktaraj in 2020
- Born: 29 January 1973 (age 53); Isniq, SAP Kosovo, SFR Yugoslavia (present-day Kosovo)
- Occupation: Actor
- Years active: 1996–present

Arben Bajraktaraj (born 29 January 1973) is a Kosovar-born French actor. Bajraktaraj has starred in numerous French films but also in roles in international movies, such as Eden Log and Sex Traffic. He has frequently portrayed crime syndicate operatives in films like Taken and Verso. He is also well known for his role as the Death Eater Antonin Dolohov in the Harry Potter films. He has worked throughout his career with numerous film directors such as Gérard Pirès, Xavier Ruiz, Tony Gatlif and Pierre Morel.

== Early life ==
Arben Bajraktaraj was born in Isniq, Kosovo, on 29 January 1973. He completed primary school at Liria Primary School (now Isa Boletini Primary School) in Isniq. During his childhood and early adolescence, while herding cattle in the mountains of his homeland, he became interested in literature as inspired by Kângë Kreshnikësh from the natural beauties of the mountains. He finished high school in Maribor, Slovenia, where he received his first lessons in theater. He continued his education in Paris at Acting International, with Professor Robert Cordier.

== Partial filmography ==
- Glowing Eyes (2002)
- Sex Traffic (2004) – Thaki
- Au bout du quai (2004) – Ibrahim
- Sky Fighters (2005) – Fredericks
- Harry Potter and the Order of the Phoenix (2007) – Antonin Dolohov (Death Eater)
- Les bleus: premiers pas dans la police (1 episode, 2007) – Akim Tasko
- Eden Log (2007) – Technician
- Taken (2008) – Marko
- Les Insoumis (2008) – Marinescu
- Flics (1 episode, 2008) – Vlad
- Korkoro (2009) – Darko
- Verso (2009) – Besim
- Of Gods and Men (2010) – Ouvrier croate 2
- Sarah's Key (2010) – M. Starzynski
- Harry Potter and the Deathly Hallows – Part 1 (2010) – Antonin Dolohov (Death Eater)
- Polisse (2011) – Yougo échappé
- Welcome to Hoxford: The Fan Film (2011, short) – Warden Gordon Barken
- Le Jour de la grenouille (2011) – L'homme d'un soir
- To Redemption (2012) – Valmir
- Man on Asphalt (2012)
- The Woman Who Brushed Off Her Tears (2012) – Lucien
- Mains armées (2012) – Gustav Alana 'Coach'
- Superstar (2012) – Associé Lolita Club
- L'homme qui rit (2012) – Hardquanone
- La Cité rose (2012) – Gitan
- La mante religieuse (2012) – Stan
- Joséphine (2013) – Le forain
- The Hero (2014) – Hero
- Call My Agent! (2015 TV series) – Gabor Rajevski
- Missions (2017 TV series) – Soviet cosmonaut Vladimir Komarov
- Nicky Larson et le parfum de Cupidon (2019) – Black Gloves
- Besa (TV series) (2020 TV series) – Dardan Berisha
- Policë për kokë (2023) – Astrit Kulla
- Waterdrop – Ilir
