= Tip TV =

Albanian children's TV channel

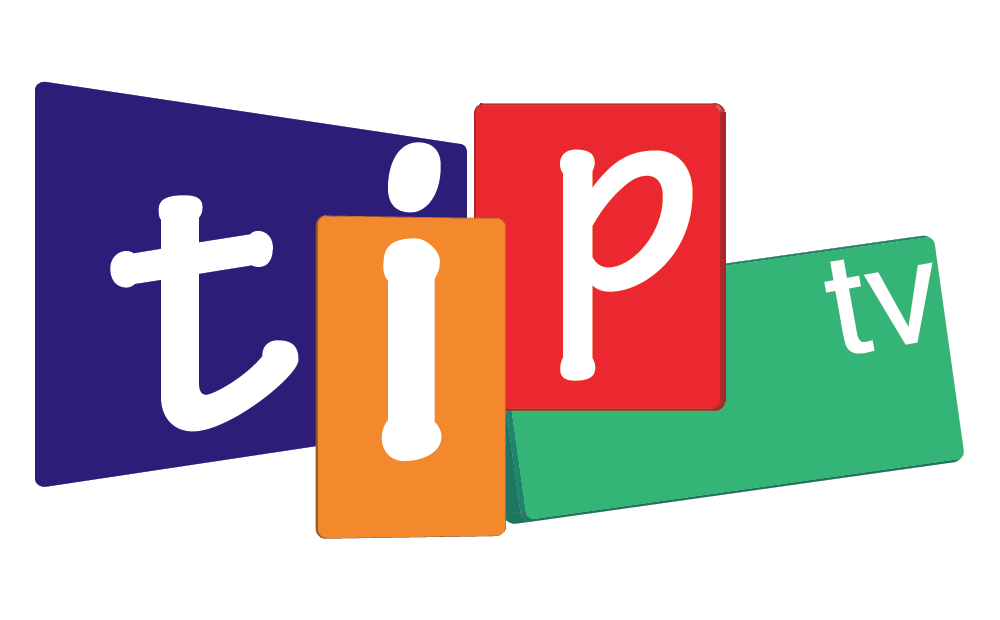
- Country: Albania
- Broadcast area: 14 countries: Albania; Kosovo; North Macedonia; Montenegro; Greece; Germany; Italy; Switzerland; United Kingdom; Austria; Sweden; Belgium; Luxembourg; Denmark
- Headquarters: Tirana, Albania

Programming
- Language: Albanian
- Picture format: 16:9 (576i, SDTV)

Ownership
- Owner: Tring
- Sister channels: Tring Tring; Tring Kids; Bubble

History
- Launched: 10 October 2011; 14 years ago

Links
- Website: www.tring.al

Tip TV is an Albanian television channel for children and teenagers aged 6 to 17. It was launched on 10 October 2011 at 04:00 pm by the TV platform Tring. The channel's content is either dubbed or subtitled in Albanian.

== Programming ==
=== Original Productions ===
- Artist Tak Fak
- Hip Hop Show
- I Love Music
- Superhero Quiz
- Tring Art Club

=== Animated series ===
- Heroic Age (Starways)
- Huntik: Secrets & Seekers (Huntik)
- Kung Fu Dino Posse (Kung Fu Dino)
- Monster Allergy (Alergji nga përbindëshat)
- The Invisible Man (Njeriu i padukshëm)
- What's with Andy? (Ç'po shpik Andi?)

=== Live-Action TV Series ===
- Aliens in America (Nxënësi i ri)
- Big Time Rush (Ëndrra e suksesit)
- Blue Water High (Shkolla e notit)
- Dino Dan (Dino Den)
- Game Shakers (Superloja)
- H_{2}O: Just Add Water (H_{2}O)
- House of Anubis (Shtëpia e sekreteve)
- K.C. Undercover (Kej-Si në një mision të fshehtë)
- Liv and Maddie (Binjaket)
- Maggie & Bianca: Fashion Friends (Megi dhe Bianca)
- Mako: Island of Secrets (Mako: Ishulli i sirenave)
- Merlin (Sekreti magjik)
- Mortified (Pse mua?)
- Sam & Cat (Semi dhe Keti)
- Sonny with a Chance (Soni mes yjesh)
- The Adventures of Shirley Holmes (Aventurat e Shirley Holmes)
- The Sarah Jane Adventures (Aventurat e Sarës)
- Think Big
- Victorious (Hollywood Arts)
- Wingin' It (Engjëll në kampus)

=== Animated Movies ===
- A Matter of Loaf and Death (Uollas dhe Gromit në një çështje për jetë a vdekje)
- A Monster in Paris (Një përbindësh në Paris)
- Appleseed Alpha (Appleseed Alpha: Në kërkim të qytetit Olimp)
- Brave (Ariu dhe harku)
- Cloudy with a Chance of Meatballs (Rrebesh qoftesh)
- Coraline (Koralina dhe porta magjike)
- Despicable Me (Gru dhe minionët)
- Despicable Me 2 (Gru dhe minionët 2)
- Dragon Hunters (Gjuetarët e dragonjve)
- Epic (Leafmen)
- Fantastic Mr. Fox (Aventurat e qytetarit Fox)
- Frozen (Një aventurë e akullt)
- Gnomeo & Juliet (Qeramikat)
- Horton Hears a Who! (Hortoni dëgjon diçka)
- Igor (Igori)
- Minions (Minionët)
- Moana (Vaiana: Ishulli legjendar)
- Monsters University (Monsters & Co 2)
- Penguins of Madagascar (Pinguinët e Madagaskarit)
- Planes (Fluturimi i heroit)
- Puss in Boots (Maçoku me çizme)
- Ratatouille (Ratatuja)
- Shrek
- Sing (Të gjithë në skenë)
- Tangled (Flokëarta)
- The Book of Life (Legjenda e Manolos)
- The Boss Baby (Shefi i vogël)
- The Pirate Fairy (Këmbora dhe anija pirate)
- The Road to El Dorado (Rruga për në El Dorado)
- Toy Story 3 (Bota e lodrave 3)
- WALL-E (Uoll-E)
- Wreck-It Ralph (Ralf shkatërruesi)
- Zootopia (Qyteti i kafshëve)

=== Live-Action Movies ===
- A Wrinkle in Time (Një udhëtim përmes universit)
- Agent Cody Banks (Adolegjenti)
- Akeelah and the Bee (Një fjalë për një ëndërr)
- Alexander and the Terrible, Horrible, No Good, Very Bad Day (Një ditë fantastike për të mos u harruar)
- Alice Through the Looking Glass (Liza përtej pasqyrës)
- Alvin and the Chipmunks (Alvin superstari)
- Alvin and the Chipmunks: The Squeakquel (Alvin superstari 2)
- Alvin and the Chipmunks: Chipwrecked (Alvin superstari 3)
- An American Girl: Saige Paints the Sky (Qielli i Seixhit)
- Annabelle Hooper and the Ghosts of Nantucket (Anabel Huper dhe fantazma e Nentakit)
- Another Cinderella Story (Një tjetër histori Hirusheje)
- Aquamarine (Shoqja ime sirenë)
- Beauty and the Beast (E bukura dhe bisha)
- Beethoven (Bethoven: Një më shumë në familje)
- Bratz (Bratz: Filmi)
- Bridge to Terabithia (Ura për në Terabithia)
- Bring It On (Lart e më lart)
- Camp Rock (Kampi i rokut)
- Camp Rock 2: The Final Jam (Kampi i rokut 2: Konkursi final)
- Cheaper by the Dozen (Duzina ime e çmendur)
- Cheaper by the Dozen 2 (Duzina ime e çmendur 2)
- City of Ember (Qyteti i Emberit)
- Daddy Day Camp (Kampingu i baballarëve)
- Daddy Day Care (Kopshti i baballarëve)
- Descendants (Pasardhësit)
- Diary of a Wimpy Kid (Ditari i një dështaku)
- Diary of a Wimpy Kid 2: Rodrick Rules (Ditari i një dështaku 2)
- Diary of a Wimpy Kid: Dog Days (Ditari i një dështaku 3)
- Diary of a Wimpy Kid: The Long Haul (Ditari i një dështaku 3)
- Dolphin Tale (Pacienti Winter)
- Dolphin Tale 2 (Pacienti Winter 2)
- Dr. Dolittle (Doktori i kafshëve)
- Dr. Dolittle 2 (Doktori i kafshëve 2)
- Dr. Dolittle 3 (Doktori i kafshëve 3)
- Ella Enchanted (Bota magjike e Elës)
- Enchanted (Kënaqësia)
- Flubber (Ëndrrat prej gome)
- Freaky Friday (E premtja e çmendur)
- Hannah Montana: Best of Both Worlds Concert (Hana Montana: Koncerti)
- Hannah Montana: The Movie (Hana Montana: Filmi)
- Harry Potter and the Philosopher's Stone (Harry Potter dhe guri filozofal)
- Harry Potter and the Chamber of Secrets (Harry Potter dhe dhoma e sekreteve)
- Harry Potter and the Prisoner of Azkaban (Harry Potter dhe i burgosuri i Azkabanit)
- Harry Potter and the Goblet of Fire (Harry Potter dhe kupa e zjarrit)
- High School Musical (Koncerti i gjimnazit)
- High School Musical 2 (Koncerti i gjimnazit 2)
- High School Musical 3: Senior Year (Koncerti i gjimnazit 3)
- Horrid Henry: The Movie (Henri i tmerrshëm)
- Invisible Sister (Motra ime e padukshme)
- Jessica Darling's IT List (Lista shkollore e Jesika Darling)
- Journey to the Center of the Earth (Udhëtim në qendër të Tokës)
- Jumanji (Loja e xhunglës)
- Little Manhattan (Në Manhatan)
- Maleficent (Bukuroshja e fjetur)
- Material Girls (Vajzat materialiste)
- Mr. Popper's Penguins (Pinguinët e babait)
- Nanny McPhee (Neni Mek Fi)
- Nanny McPhee and the Big Bang (Neni Mek Fi dhe shpërthimi i madh)
- Nim's Island (Ishulli i Nimit)
- Pan (Udhëtim në ishullin e panjohur)
- Percy Jackson & the Olympians: The Lightning Thief (Hajduti i rrufeve)
- Percy Jackson: Sea of Monsters (Deti i përbindëshave)
- Princess Protection Program (Programi i mbrojtjes së princeshave)
- RV (Një kamping i pazakontë)
- She's the Man (Ajo është ai)
- Spy Kids (Agjentët e vegjël)
- Spy Kids 2: The Island of Lost Dreams (Agjentët e vegjël 2)
- Spy Kids 3-D: Game Over (Agjentët e vegjël 3)
- Spy Kids: All the Time in the World (Agjentët e vegjël dhe tregtari i lodrave)
- Stormbreaker (Rekruti)
- Teenage Mutant Ninja Turtles (Breshkat ninxha)
- Teenage Mutant Ninja Turtles II: The Secret of the Ooze (Breshkat ninxha 2)
- Teenage Mutant Ninja Turtles III (Breshkat ninxha 3)
- The BFG (Miku im gjigand)
- The Chronicles of Narnia: The Lion, the Witch and the Wardrobe (Kronikat e Narnias: Luani, shtriga dhe garderoba)
- The Chronicles of Narnia: Prince Caspian (Kronikat e Narnias: Princi Kaspian)
- The Chronicles of Narnia: The Voyage of the Dawn Treader (Kronikat e Narnias: Rrugëtimi i anijes me vela)
- The Karate Kid (Djali i karatesë)
- The Last Song (Kënga e fundit)
- The Little Rascals (Mistrecat e vegjël)
- The Parent Trap (Prindër në kurth)
- The Princess Diaries (Ditari i princeshës)
- The Princess Diaries 2: Royal Engagement (Ditari i princeshës 2: Fejesa mbretërore)
- The Velveteen Rabbit (Një lepur special)
- Who Framed Roger Rabbit (Kush e futi në kurth lepurin Roxher)
- Wizards of Waverly Place: The Movie (Magjistarët e sheshit Uejverli)

== See also ==
- Television in Albania
- Vizion Plus
