= ALBtelecom Mobile =

ALBtelecom
- Native name: ALBtelecom Mobile
- Formerly: Eagle Mobile
- Company type: Private
- Industry: Telecommunications
- Founded: March 2008
- Defunct: 14 March 2023
- Fate: Eagle Mobile merged with ALBtelecom to create ALBtelecom Mobile. Then in 2023, ALBtelecom merged with One Telecommunications to create One Albania
- Successor: One Albania
- Headquarters: Tirana, Albania
- Key people: Tahsin Yilmaz
- Products: Prepaid and postpaid mobile phones
- Owner: Formerly ALBtelecom, now One Albania
- Website: www.albtelecom.al

ALBtelecom Mobile, formerly known as Eagle Mobile, was a mobile communication company that operates in Albania. Back in March 2008, it was first founded as a subsidiary of ALBtelecom, which had been privatized in October 2007, with a majority of shares sold by the Albanian government to a consortium of two Turkish companies; Calik Holding and Türk Telekom. Calik possesses 80% of the company and Türk Telekom the remaining 20%.

== Background ==
Eagle Mobile is a former brand name of ALBtelecom based in Albania and, starting from August 2017, it became known as ALBtelecom Mobile.

The former, Eagle Mobile, entered as the 3rd operator of mobile telephony in Albania on 12 March 2008.

The operator was established on October 23, 2003, from the Albanian government as an integral part of ALBtelecom, a fixed telephony operator in Albania.

The privatization started in 2005 and was finalised on September 28, 2007, when one of the biggest companies in Turkey, Çalik Group, purchased 76% of the shares along with its partner Türk Telekom. The other 24% of the shares belong to the Albanian government.

=== Privatisation ===
The agreement was signed from the Minister of Economy, Trade and Energy, Genc Ruli and the President of Çalik Holding, Ahmet Çalik, in Tirana. In March 2008, the prime ministers of Albania and Turkey, Sali Berisha and Recep Tayyip Erdoğan greeted each other upon a symbolic "ALO" which opened officially the communication of Eagle Mobile, the company which carried the symbol of Albania and Albanians, the Eagle.

Eagle Mobile entered the Albanian market of telecommunication on March 12, 2008. In a very short period of 6 months, Eagle Mobile covered the entire territory of the country by exceeding its speed and predictions for network set up. On December 31, 2008, the company attained coverage by 97% of the population of the country and 90.7% of the territory of the country and provided services to the whole Albania.

ALBtelecom and Eagle invested 150 million Euro, providing job possibilities to around 1000 Albanian professionals, the majority of them women. With the network made by more than 377 base stations, Eagle has the best coverage with 92.5 percent of the territory and 98.5 percent of population.

Back in 2013, Eagle had more than 1,470,000 subscribers, and 150 shops across Albania.

The CEO of ALBtelecom Mobile is Tahsin Yilmaz.

Display Name

The display name of ALBtelecom is: ALBtelecom, but some phones might display the old name which was EAGLE AL.

== Services ==
ALBtelecom Mobile (former Eagle) is the third operator in Albania to provide 3G technology. In February 2012 a tender for the third 3G license in Albania where the minimum acceptable price was €12.5 million failed after Eagle mobile offered €3.55 million and Plus offered €3.55 million. Another tender was held in October of the same year. This time it was for two 3G licenses and the starting bid was 4 million euros. Eagle Mobile offered 4.355 million Euros while Plus only 1, making Eagle the only one to acquire the 3G license. The first 3G license was won by Vodafone Albania, bidding 31.4 million Euros and the second one by AMC after a 15.1 million Euros bid.

In the beginning of 2013 Eagle Mobile launched its first 3G network, with coverage initially available in the region of Tirana, Fushë-Krujë and Airport.

== Market share ==
Albania had, in 2012, 5.3 million subscribers (187% penetration rate), out of which there were 3.2 million active users (114% penetration rate). An active user is the number of users that communicated in the last three months.

The regulatory authority for telecommunication in Albania is the Electronic and Postal Communications Authority.

Rank	Operator	Technology	Subscribers (in millions)	Ownership
1	Vodafone	GSM-900/1800; UMTS, HSPA, HSPA+, 4G, 4G+	1.839 or 34.76% (2012)	Vodafone
2	Telekom	GSM-900/1800; UMTS, HSPA, HSPA+, 4G, 4G+	1.736 or 32.82% (2012)	Deutsche Telecom
3	ALBtelecom Mobile	GSM-900/1800; UMTS, HSPA, HSPA+, 4G	1.304 or 24.66% (2012)	Albtelecom
4	Plus	GSM-900/1800	0.410 or 7.76% (2012)	Plus Communication

== See also ==
- List of mobile network operators of Europe
- Vodafone
- Telekom
- Plus
