= The Family Channel =

The Family Channel or Family Channel may refer to:

- The Family Channel (American TV network, founded 1990), the third former name of Freeform
- The Family Channel (American TV network, founded 2008), formerly My Family TV
- The Family Channel (British TV channel), a British game show television channel now known as Challenge
- Family Channel (Canada), a Canadian specialty television channel

== See also ==
- Fox Family (disambiguation)
- Freeform (disambiguation)
