= Tring (media company) =

Albanian media company

Tring TV
- Formerly: Theatre International sh.p.k (2004–2008); Tring Communications; Tring Digital
- Type: Joint stock company
- Industry: Telecommunication, publishing
- Founded: December 14, 2004; 21 years ago
- Founder: Artan Dulaku
- Headquarters: Tirana, Albania
- Products: TV channels with a variety of programs
- Owner: Vertex Holding
- Subsidiaries: Vizion Plus, Tring Tring, Tip TV
- Website: tring.al

Tring TV (formerly Tring Communications and Tring Digital) is an Albanian media company headquartered in Tirana. Founded in 2004 as part of Albanian Satellite Communications (ASC), the company provides digital television, IPTV, internet, telephony and over-the-top (OTT) media services in Albania and for the Albanian diaspora abroad. Tring is one of the two major pay television platforms in the country, alongside DigitAlb.

== History ==
Businessman Artan Dulaku established Theatre International sh.p.k in 2004, a privately owned telecommunications company. It became operational by 2007 and launched under the Tring Communications brand the following year.

The platform initially focused on satellite and digital television broadcasting before expanding into IPTV, broadband internet and fixed telephony services. During its early years, Tring invested heavily in digital broadcasting infrastructure and content acquisition, becoming one of Albania’s leading subscription television operators. By 2009, Tring had already been serving 30,000 households in the country.

In 2018, the company celebrated its tenth anniversary, describing itself as the country's only "multi-dimensional media" operator offering television, internet and telephone services in a single package. At the time, Tring offered more than 120 channels through its My Tring IPTV service.

Over the years, Tring expanded its programming portfolio through licensing agreements with international broadcasters and distributors. In 2020, the company signed a long-term content agreement with Kanal D International for the distribution of Turkish television dramas in Albania.

In 2025, local media reported that Tring was acquired by Vertex Holding, a company linked to Kosovo-based investors. The transaction was reviewed and later approved by the Albanian Competition Authority.

== Television channels ==
Tring operates several thematic television channels focused on entertainment, film, sports, documentaries and children’s programming. One of its best known channels is Tring Tring, launched in 2009 and featuring Albanian-dubbed animated series and original educational content.

The platform has broadcast international sports competitions including Formula One and the Premier League through exclusive rights agreements.

== See also ==
- Vizion Plus
- Tring Tring
- Tip TV
