= .al =

Top-level Internet domain for Albania

- Introduced: 21 April 1992
- TLD type: Country code top-level domain
- Status: Active
- Registry: Electronic and Postal Communications Authority (AKEP)
- Sponsor: Electronic and Postal Communications Authority
- Intended use: Entities connected with Albania
- Actual use: Very popular in Albania, also used elsewhere. Sometimes used in the US state of Alabama.
- Registration restrictions: Free for anyone, some restrictions apply only on second level domains (ex: .com.al) which are allowed only for Albanian citizens and businesses registered in Albania
- Dispute policies: Disputes must be with registrant alone; NIC disclaims all legal responsibilities
- DNSSEC: Yes
- Registry website: akep.al

.al is the Internet country code top-level domain (ccTLD) for Albania. It is administered by the Electronic and Postal Communications Authority of Albania (AKEP).

AKEP recommends that .al domain registrations be performed with one of the AKEP accredited registrars. There are also international registrars that resell .al domains. Domain names should be between 2 and 63 characters. Although the Albanian language has a number of special characters, the registry has not enabled the use of IDN characters.

== 2nd level registrations ==
In the past, registrations were not permitted directly at the second level, but a few existing names were "grandfathered"; they were uniti.al, tirana.al, soros.al, upt.al and inima.al.

In 2012 registrars started to resell .al domain names widely making them popular outside Albania as domain hacks.

In November 2014 the registry released two character domain names allowing for free landrush.

== 3rd level registrations ==
Registrations used to be only beneath the second-levels, i.e., .com.al, .net.al, .org.al, and .edu.al labeled appropriately for the type of organisation, but many now exist directly below .al.

== Whois servers ==
As of November 1, 2019, the Autoriteti i Komunikimeve Elektronike dhe Postare (AKEP) has mandated that all AKEP accredited registrars begin verifying and updating the WHOIS contact information for all new domain registrations and Registrant contact modifications.

== Domain figures ==
As of the end of 2022 there were 27,275 registered .al-domains.
