= Policë për kokë =

2023 Albanian comedy film

- Directed by: Aldo Marku
- Written by: Aldo Marku
- Produced by: Olsi Bylyku; Evi Spaho
- Starring: Olsi Bylyku; Nik Xhelilaj; Alfred Trebicka; Sara Kolami; Arben Bajraktaraj; Emiljano Bufazi
- Cinematography: Shpëtim Baça
- Edited by: Mentor Selmani
- Music by: Fatos Qerimaj
- Production company: Blueberry’s Production
- Release date: January 12, 2023
- Running time: 100 minutes
- Country: Albania
- Language: Albanian

Policë për kokë is a 2023 Albanian comedy film directed by Aldo Marku. It stars Olsi Bylyku and Nik Xhelilaj.

== Plot ==
Xhino, a rookie police officer, has a single driving force in his life: to honor the memory of his late father and make him proud. Determined and focused, Xhino throws himself into his work, hoping to leave a mark on the force. However, his career takes an unexpected and significant turn when he is paired with his new partner, the infamous detective Maksimilian Murati.

== Cast ==
- Olsi Bylyku as Xhino Pasmaçiu
- Nik Xhelilaj as Maksimilian Murati
- Alfred Trebicka as Chief of Police
- Sara Kolami as Mina
- Arben Bajraktaraj as Astrit Kulla
- Emiljano Bufazi as Fiorentino Beta
- Ervis Bici as Lupo
- Klodian Hoxha as Irkan Spahiu
- Besnik Tafallari as Mustafa
- Franc Bregu as the IT agent
- Urim Aliaj as Kuqo
