= Matura Shtetërore =

Educational qualification in Albania

State Graduation (in Albanian Matura Shtetërore) is a system regarding final exams that young adults (aged 17, 18, or 19) take at the end of their secondary education in Albania. It was created by the Albanian Ministry of Education and Science in 2006, as a project that would avoid the corruption, lack of control, and favoritism that had characterized the prior aptitude examination system, Matura.

== Requirements of the State Matura ==
Unlike the previous system, which consisted of three two-part examinations (written and oral Literature, written and oral Mathematics, and written and oral Physics), State Graduation consists of three compulsory exams (written Mathematics, written Literature, and English) and two other exams. These last two exams are chosen by the student from a pool of subjects (Chemistry, Biology, Physics, English, History-Geography, and Sociology-Economy-Philosophy). What two subjects they choose depends on their university preference. Each university's faculty chooses its own preferred profile (scientific or social) and its own preferred subjects. These preferences are made known to the prospective students. A student must keep in mind these preferences stated by the various faculties when choosing the two subjects.

== Criticism ==
However, this system has been much criticized for the high level of difficulty, subjectivity (in Literature), and strict grading, resulting in low scoring averages. For example, in the second Literature exam, which took place on Saturday, June 9, 2007, only fifteen 10s (the highest possible score) were received in the entire republic (out of 30,000 students). It was also noted that very few 5s (the minimal non-failing grade) were received, while there were almost no failing students. The most common grades were 6, 7, and 8, stirring considerable disappointment and anger among students, who also said they did not know where to complain and were worried about the effects these grades could have on their application to universities outside Albania.

== Security ==
Concerns have also been raised about the State Graduation's rigorous security precautions. For example, the teachers who create the test are isolated for a whole week, without any means of communication with the outside world. The exam papers and answer sheets are always accompanied by the police. They are distributed in DHL envelopes during different hours of the night, according to the distance of the school from the Ministry. All the envelopes are supposed to be opened at exactly the same time, 10 a.m. All exams are double-checked to avoid any possible mistakes. However, teachers are chosen randomly, and most teachers outside the capital lack the proper academic level.

== See also ==
- Education in Albania
- Matura
