= ABCom =

- Type: Joint stock company
- Industry: Telecommunication, Publishing
- Genre: Albanian TV Platform
- Founded: April 1998; 28 years ago
- Fate: Merged with Vodafone Albania
- Successor: Vodafone Albania
- Headquarters: Tirana, Albania
- Area served: Albania, Kosovo, Europe
- Products: TV Channels with a variety of programs.
- Parent: Vodafone Albania
- Website: Official website

Albanian Broadband Communication (ABCom) was an Albanian telecommunications, television and internet provider. It was established in April 1998, and is one of the ISP operating in the country.

== History ==
ABCOM was created in April 1998 in Albania. ABCOM is the first service provider in Albania. It is based in Tirana. ABCom was functional in 6 cities before it was purchased. When the merge process was completed in 2020 Vodafone Albania announced that it will invest 100 million euros to improve the fixed line services, internet speeds and capacities.
