= Fox family =

Fox Family or Fox family may refer to:

== Genealogy ==
- Fox family (English aristocracy), a noble family
- Robin Fox family, an extended family of actors
- Fox sisters, three 19th-century sisters involved in the creation of the religious movement Spiritualism

== Companies/channels ==
- Fox Family Channel, a former name of American television cable network Freeform
- Fox Family Films, currently known as 20th Century Animation
- A former name of 20th Century Family
- Fox Family, currently known as Star Fun

== Other ==
- A family of foxes
- The Fox Family, a 2006 South Korean film
