= Kung Fu Dino Posse =

Animated television series

- Title card
- Hangul: 쿵푸 공룡 수호대
- RR: Kungpu gongnyong suhodae
- MR: K'ungp'u kongnyong suhodae
- Genre: Action; Comedy
- Created by: Peter M. Lenkov
- Written by: Paul Greenberg; John Derevlany; Peter M. Lenkov; Al Schwartz
- Directed by: Dong-wook Lee
- Voices of: Matthew Gorman; Laura Kolisnyk; Brent Hirose; Nolan Balzer; Simon Miron; Carey Smith; Kevin Michele
- Countries of origin: Canada; South Korea; Singapore; Germany
- No. of seasons: 1
- No. of episodes: 40

Production
- Executive producers: Michael Hirsh; Toper Taylor; Pamela Slavin; Al Schwartz; Han-Young Kang; Moon-Ju Kang; Attila Leyai
- Producers: Jonah Stroh; Eun-Joo Jang; Chung-Bok Lee; Andreas Drewling; Henning Westerwelle
- Running time: 22 minutes
- Production companies: Cookie Jar Entertainment; Sunwoo Entertainment; Sunwoo Asia-Pacific; Optix Entertainment

Original release
- Network: KBS1
- Release: 12 November 2009 – 4 September 2010

Kung Fu Dino Posse is an animated television series created by Peter M. Lenkov and produced by Cookie Jar Entertainment Inc., Sunwoo Entertainment Co. Ltd., Sunwoo Asia-Pacific Pte. Ltd., and Optix Entertainment GmbH. In South Korea, it premiered on November 12, 2009 on KBS1. It premiered on October 2, 2010 on Starz Kids & Family in the United States, YTV and Vrak (French Canadian dub) in Canada, and CITV in the United Kingdom.

The series is about anthropomorphic dinosaurs with kung fu powers.

== Cast and characters ==
=== Kung Fu Dino Posse ===
- Kane (케인): A Green Tyrannosaurus rex, and the leader of the Posse. He is the most headstrong (perhaps too headstrong) and confident of the Posse, and his just heart won't let Skor get away with his evil plans. Sometimes, he can get a little too serious with the task at hand, and his pride can get the better of him in some situations, but he is a natural leader and will be first to the rescue when his friends are in trouble. Apparently, he prefers quieter hobbies, previously didn't like loud music and is still less familiar with the modern world. He is voiced by Um Sang-hyun in Korean, and Matthew Gorman and Simon Miron in English).
- Lucy (루시): A Yellow Triceratops, and the only girl in the Posse. She is quite resilient, calm, collected, and can follow and enforce orders from Kane without hesitation, but can be quite sarcastic. She is quite worldly and knowledgeable of the time of the dinosaurs and the modern era. She is seemingly quite into "girl stuff" in the modern era, such as having "girl talks", and her mannerisms and personality also reflect this, she sometimes gets annoyed with Jet and Chow's immature remarks or actions. She is voiced by Kim Seon-hye in Korean, and Laura Kolisnyk in English.
- Jet (제트): An Orange Pteranodon. Comes off as the most street-smart and (modern) worldly of the Posse, especially in terms of language (referring to many people as "dudes"), and a comic relief. He comes off as rude, somewhat of a jerk, full-of-himself and quick to cover up a situation with words to those who are unaware, but can be helpful. At times, he can be quite hasty which gets him captured or into trouble, usually as a result of trying to command the Posse, and take charge from Kane. He is voiced by Yang Seok-jeong in Korean, and Brent Hirose in English.
- Chow (차우): A Red Stegosaurus who has a voracious appetite. The largest and physically strongest dino in the Posse, and not exactly the smartest dino out there and can come off as somewhat clumsy and naïve, and more often than not, his appetite gets the best of him, but he is a very friendly and kind, dinosaur, just don't hide food from him. He seems quite quick to adapt and mimic the personalities and mannerisms of different people and new situations. He is voiced by Hong Jin-wook in Korean, and Nolan Balzer in English.

=== Friends of the Posse ===
- Edgar Chudley (Gang Udi (강우디) in the Korean version): He aids the Posse with his knowledge in mathematics, science and technology. Sometimes his knowledge and overthinking is too much for the Posse. He lives in the museum with the posse. He is voiced by Kim Ji-hye in Korean, and Simon Miron in English.
- Polly Daniels (Sunwoo Yuri (선우 유리) in the Korean version): Another friend of the posse, who studies in the field of paleontology. Edgar has a crush on her. She is voiced by Seo Ji-yeon in Korean, and Amy Tang in English.

=== Secondary characters ===
- Agatha Dimplecorn (Grandmother Sarah (사라할머니) in the Korean version): She is an elderly lady who is often heckling (unintentionally) with the Kung Fu Dino Posse. She is voiced by Cho Jin-sook in Korean, and Gloria Nikkel in English.
- Professor Sherman Daniels (Dr. Seonwoo (선우 박사) in the Korean version): Polly's grandfather and curator of the museum. He is voiced by Nam Doh-yeong in Korean.

=== Antagonists ===
- Skor (Seuko (스코) in the Korean version): The main antagonist of the series, and older brother of Skrap, he usually orders Skrap and his other minions to do his dirty work, such as stealing crystals from the Posse, while he stays in his lair. Although both Skor and Skrap are both referred to "raptors" in the first episode, they both have neck frills akin to the Dilophosaurus depicted in the 1993 film Jurassic Park. He is voiced by Hong Si-ho in Korean, and Carey Smith in English.
- Skrap (Tako (타코) in the Korean version): Skor's younger, less intelligent brother, who reluctantly takes orders from his brother to do his dirty work. His regular incompetence with tasks disappoints and annoys Skor. He is voiced by Baek Seung-chul in Korean, and Kevin Michele in English.

== Episodes ==
No.	Title	Directed by	Written by	Original release date
1	"Meet the Posse"	Chris Labonte, Dong-wook Lee, Seok-pyo Hong	Paul Greenberg	12 November 2009
2	"Jurassic Roadshow"	Chris Labonte, Dong-wook Lee, Seok-pyo Hong	Paul Greenberg	TBA
3	"Flower Power"	Chris Labonte, Dong-wook Lee, Seok-pyo Hong	John Derevlany	TBA
4	"Miss Congenialosaur"	Chris Labonte, Dong-wook Lee, Seok-pyo Hong	John Derevlany	TBA
5	"Dinos on a Plane"	Chris Labonte, Dong-wook Lee, Seok-pyo Hong	Al Schwartz	TBA
6	"All the Queen's Dinos"	Chris Labonte, Dong-wook Lee, Seok-pyo Hong	Paul Greenberg	TBA
7	"Digging for Dinos"	Paul Brown, Dong-wook Lee	Paul Greenberg	TBA
8	"Extreme Edgar"	Paul Brown, Dong-wook Lee	Al Schwartz	TBA
9	"Straight Outta Megaopolis"	Chris Labonte, Dong-wook Lee	John Derevlany	TBA
10	"Polly, I Shrunk the Dinos"	Chris Labonte, Dong-wook Lee, Seok-pyo Hong	Al Schwartz	TBA
11	"Wing Nuts"	Chris Labonte, Dong-wook Lee	John Derevlany	TBA
12	"Best Dino Friends Forever"	Chris Labonte, Dong-wook Lee	Paul Greenberg	TBA
13	"To Skor, with Lava"	Chris Labonte, Dong-wook Lee	Al Schwartz	TBA
14	"Swimming Lessons"	Paul Brown, Dong-wook Lee	John Derevlany	TBA
15	"Dino Demotion"	Paul Brown, Dong-wook Lee	Paul Greenberg	TBA
16	"Dinos in Space"	Paul Brown, Dong-wook Lee	Al Schwartz	TBA
17	"Loose Links"	Paul Brown, Dong-wook Lee	John Derevlany	TBA
18	"Dino Cruise"	Paul Brown, Dong-wook Lee	Paul Greenberg	TBA
19	"Dimplecorn"	Paul Brown, Dong-wook Lee	John Derevlany	TBA
20	"Dinos in the Desert"	Paul Brown, Dong-wook Lee	Al Schwartz	TBA
21	"Pins and Pickles"	Chris Labronte, Dong-wook Lee, Seok-pyo Hong	Paul Greenberg	TBA
22	"Kung Fu Cloned Clowns Rule!"	Paul Brown, Dong-wook Lee	John Derevlany	TBA
23	"Attack of the Were-Dino"	Paul Brown, Dong-wook Lee	Al Schwartz	TBA
24	"Dino Get-Away"	Paul Brown, Dong-wook Lee	Paul Greenberg	TBA
25	"Mindless Fun"	Paul Brown, Dong-wook Lee	John Derevlany & Atul N. Rao	10 June 2010
Skor and Skrap infiltrate the museum, only to turn the KFDP (expect for Jet) into their personal slaves with the use of mind-control parasites from their newest dinosaur-like mutant abomination. Jet and Edgar are the only ones who could stop them.
26	"Dinos on Ice"	Paul Brown, Dong-wook Lee	Al Schwartz	TBA
27	"Skored Straight"	Paul Brown, Dong-wook Lee	Paul Greenberg	TBA
28	"Silent But Dino"	Paul Brown, Dong-wook Lee	John Derevlany	TBA
29	"Dino of the Year"	Paul Brown, Dong-wook Lee	Al Schwartz	TBA
30	"A Pain in the Neck"	Paul Brown, Dong-wook Lee	John Derevlany	TBA
31	"Megaloporock"	Paul Brown, Dong-wook Lee	Paul Greenberg	TBA
32	"Evil Lair of the Month"	Paul Brown, Dong-wook Lee	Al Schwartz	TBA
33	"Team Gnarly"	Paul Brown, Dong-wook Lee	John Derevlany	TBA
34	"Won't Get Skooled Again"	Paul Brown, Dong-wook Lee	Paul Greenberg	TBA
35	"A Very Dino Wedding"	Paul Brown, Dong-wook Lee	Al Schwartz	TBA
36	"Jet Lays an Egg"	Paul Brown, Dong-wook Lee	John Derevlany	TBA
37	"Breaking Up is Hard to Do"	Paul Brown, Dong-wook Lee	Paul Greenberg	TBA
38	"The Mayor of Skoropolis"	Paul Brown, Dong-wook Lee	Al Schwartz	TBA
39	"Gator Grudge"	Paul Brown, Dong-wook Lee	Paul Greenberg	TBA
40	"Frankendino"	Paul Brown, Dong-wook Lee	Al Schwartz	TBA
