= Vizion Plus =

Albanian television channel

- Country: Albania
- Affiliates: Tring
- Headquarters: Tirana, Albania

Programming
- Language: Albanian
- Picture format: 576i (SDTV 16:9)

Ownership
- Owner: Artan Dulaku (33.3%); Genc Dulaku (33.3%); Adrian Dulaku (33.3%)
- Parent: Media Vizion Sh.A.

History
- Launched: September 16, 1999; 27 years ago

Links
- Website: vizionplus.tv

Availability

Terrestrial
- Albania: Analog/Digital

Vizion Plus is a national Albanian privately owned television channel established in September 16, 1999 in Tirana, Albania. The channel started as a local station and a few years later began broadcasting nationwide.

== Programs ==
In collaboration with Tring Digital, Vizion Plus produced the first Albanian edition of Dancing with the Stars. The show produced record audiences.

=== Nationally created shows ===
Original name	Format	Origin
Familja	Game show	Albania
Përrallë me Piratë	Game show	Albania
Mos u Nxeh	Game show	Albania
Histori Dashurie	Talk show	Albania
Zip	Morning show	Albania
Faktori Plus	Current affairs	Albania
Ora 5pm	Talk show	Albania
7pa5	Morning show	Albania
By Pass Show	Criticizing and problem-raising show	Albania
Chic Plus	Arts and entertainment magazine	Albania
Dancing with the Stars Albania	Variety show	Albania
Daily Dancing	Daily summary show for DWtS	Albania
Sketch Show	Comedy	Albania
Inside	Investigative	Albania
Zonë e Ndaluar	Documentary	Albania
Dita Ime	Talk show	Albania
Mos e Bëso po Deshe	Reality show	Albania
Debat nga Alfred Peza	Current affairs	Albania
Vizioni i Pasdites	Evening show	Albania
Next	Entertaining show	Albania
Debat Plus	Current affairs	Albania
Kapital	Talk show	Albania
Oktapod	Current affairs	Albania
Fresk Fare	Comedy	Albania
Tú Sí Que Vales	Talent show	Albania
Apartamenti 2XL	Comedy show	Albania
Grand Hotel 2XL	Comedy show	Albania
Tornado me Para	Quiz show	Albania
Dritare me Rudinën	Current affairs	Albania
Fustani i Endrrave	Reality, lifestyle	Albania
My Living	Reality, lifestyle	Albania
Albania's Got Talent	Talent Show	Albania
Ferma VIP	Reality competitive show	Sweden

=== International TV shows ===
Original name	Albanian translation	Origin
Yu-Gi-Oh!	Yu-Gi-Oh!	Japan
The King of Queens	Mbreti i Kuins	United States
Dawson's Creek	Përroi i Dousonit	United States
Palabra de Mujer	Fjalë Gruaje	Mexico
Sturm der Liebe	Stuhi Dashurie	Germany
Winx Club	Winx Club	Italy
Kirby: Right Back at Ya!	Kirbi	Japan
Oggy and the Cockroaches	Banda e buburrecave	France
Grizzy & the Lemmings	Gri dhe Binka	France
Fear Factor	Fear Factor	United States
Oh Baby	Oh Baby	United States
Querida Enemiga	E Dashur Armike	Mexico
Salomé	Salome	Mexico
Mundo de Fieras	Intriga	Mexico
Piel de Otoño	Gjethe Vjeshte	Mexico
En Nombre Del Amor	Ne Emër të Dashurisë	Mexico
La Madrastra	Njerka	Mexico
La usurpadora	Paulina	Mexico
Cuidado con el Angel	Kujdes nga Engjëlli	Mexico
Rebelde	Rebelët	Mexico
Corazón Salvaje	Zemër e Egër	Mexico
Ghost Whisperer	Pëshpërima e Shpirtit	United States
Revolution	Revolucioni	United States
Canan	Xhanan	Turkey
Kurtlar Vadisi	Lugina e Ujqërve	Turkey
Karadayı	Karadai	Turkey
The FBI Files	Dosja e FBI-së	United States
Crusoe	Robinson Kruzo	United Kingdom
Devious Maids	Shërbyese të Djallëzuara	United States
Good Luck Charlie	Paç Fat Çarli	United States
Scandal	Skandali	United States
Bajo las Riendas del Amor	Tradhëtia	Mexico
Soy tu Dueña	Grua e Hekurt	Mexico
Teresa	Tereza	Mexico
Triunfo del Amor	Triumfi i Dashurisë	Mexico
La Fuerza del Destino	Forca e Fatit	Mexico
Dos Hogares	Jetë e Dyfishtë	Mexico
La Que no Podía Amar	Gruaja që nuk donte të Dashuronte	Mexico
Amores Verdaderos	Dashuri të Vërteta	Mexico
La Tempestad	Stuhia	Mexico
Nora	Nora	Venezuela
Aşk ve Ceza	Dashuri dhe Ndëshkim	Turkey
Eva la Trailera	Fati i Evës	United States
Yemin	Premtimi	Turkey
Heridas de Amor	Plagë Dashurie	Mexico
Kış Güneşi	Dielli i Dimrit	Turkey
Fatih Harbiye	Mes dy Dashurish	Turkey
Gecenin Kraliçesi	Mbretëresha e Natës	Turkey
Yüksek Sosyete	Shoqëri e Lartë	Turkey
Maggie & Bianca Fashion Friends	Megi dhe Bianka	Italy
Regal Academy	Akademia Mbretërore	Italy
Kara Sevda	Dashuri Pa Fund	Turkey
Bana Sevmeyi Anlat	Krahet e Dashurisë	Turkey
Çoban Yıldızı	Ylli i Mëngjesit	Turkey
Eşkıya Dünyaya Hükümdar Olmaz	Familja e Madhe	Turkey
Rüya	Ëndërr	Turkey
Iyilik	Favori	Turkey
Ben Bu Cihana Sigmazam	I Paepuri	Turkey
Safir	Safir	Turkey

== See also ==
- Tring
- DigitAlb
- Tring Tring
- Tip TV
- Tring Sport HD
