= The Invisible Man (2005 TV series) =

- Promotional wallpaper from official website
- Also known as: A Hero Never Seen Before
- Genre: Superhero
- Voices of: David Gasman; Mirabelle Kirkland; Barbara Weber-Scaff; Matthew Géczy; Paul Bandey; Allan Wenger
- Theme music composer: John Powell
- Composer: Randy Edelman
- Countries of origin: France; Spain; Italy
- Original languages: English; French; Spanish; Italian
- No. of seasons: 1
- No. of episodes: 26

Production
- Executive producers: Christophe di Sabatino; Benoît di Sabatino; Nicolas Atlan; Carlos Biern; Javier Robles de Acuña; Annita Romanelli; Injay Tai
- Running time: 26 minutes
- Production companies: MoonScoop; BRB Internacional; Rai Fiction

Original release
- Network: Rai 2 and Rai Gulp (Italy); M6 and Disney Channel (France); Antena 3 (Spain)
- Release: 12 November 2005 – 26 August 2006

The Invisible Man is an animated series produced by MoonScoop in co-production with BRB Internacional and Rai Fiction. It is loosely based on H. G. Wells' novel The Invisible Man. Each of the 26 episodes lasts 26–30 minutes. It was aired in Italy on Rai 2.

== Plot ==
The story revolves around Alan Crystal, a genius but reckless teenager who is turned permanently invisible when an experiment goes awry. As with all good super-hero stories this one explores the issues related to leading a double life and keeping friends and secrets apart. He also finds himself a nemesis - Wallace Morton, a.k.a. Opacus.

== Characters ==
=== Main characters ===
- David Gasman as Alan Crystal/Invisible Man
- TBA as Foton
- Mirabelle Kirkland as Linda
- Barbara Weber-Scaff as Gina
- Matthew Géczy as Monty Flips

=== Villains ===
- Paul Bandey as Wallace Morton/Opacus
- Allan Wenger as Iron King

== Episode guide ==
=== Regular episodes ===
- Episode 1 - Stolen Memory (by Régis Jaulie)
- Episode 2 - The Invisible Man vs. The Invisible Man (by Stéphane Carrié)
- Episode 3 - Ears Have Eyes (by Régis Jaulin)
- Episode 4 - A Mask for Two (by Thomas Barichella and Cyril Tysz)
- Episode 5 - My Over-Visible Friend (by Hervé Benedetti & Guillaume Enard)
- Episode 6 - Visible or Invisible
- Episode 7 - Wallace the Hero
- Episode 8 - One Surprise Too Many
- Episode 9 - Out of Sight, Out of Mind
- Episode 10 - Identified
- Episode 11 - TV Star Wars
- Episode 12 - Regression
- Episode 13 - High Tech
- Episode 14 - In the Clutches of the Black Dragon
- Episode 15 - In the Beginning
- Episode 16 - Black Light
- Episode 17 - The Man Who Disappeared
- Episode 18 - Emotional Intelligence
- Episode 19 - On the Docks (Part 1)
- Episode 20 - On the Docks (Part 2)
- Episode 21 - The Enemy Within
- Episode 22 - The Schblurb
- Episode 23 - The Last Temptation of Alan

=== Special episodes ===
- Episode 24 - Flower Power (Valentine's Day Special)
- Episode 25 - Halloween Express (Halloween Special)
- Episode 26 - Night of the Puppeteer (Christmas Special)

=== Duration ===
Each of the 26 episodes lasts 26–30 minutes.

== Broadcast ==
The Invisible Man aired in the Italy on Rai 2. It is also being streamed on Tubi and RaiPlay. All the episodes of the series are available free on YouTube.
