= ALBtelecom =

Telecommunication company in Albania

ALBtelecom sh.a.
- Type: Private
- Industry: Telecommunications
- Founded: 5 December 1912
- Defunct: 14 March 2023
- Fate: Merged with One Telecommunications
- Successor: One Albania
- Headquarters: Tirana, Albania
- Key people: Ervin Shpori, CEO
- Products: Fixed Telephony; Mobile Telephony; Broadband Internet; IT Services; Networking Solutions; IP television Cloud Services
- Brands: ALBtv, ALBtelecom Mobile, ALBtelecom Wi-Fi
- Owner: 4iG Nyrt. (Antenna Hungária) 80,27%, Albanian ministry of finance and economy 13,78% and Posta Shqiptare 2,47%
- Website: www.albtelecom.al

ALBtelecom sh.a. (a shortening of Albanian Telecom, Albanian: Telekomi Shqiptar) was an Albanian telecommunications company. It was established as Albania's state company that provided telecommunications services through a fixed network. It was privatized on 1 October 2007 (following a privatization process which started in 2000), with 76% of its shares sold by the Albanian government to a consortium of two Turkish companies, Çalık Holding and Türk Telekom, with Calik taking 80% of the consortium's stake.

== History ==
On 5 December 1912 the Provisional Government led by Ismail Qemali established the Ministry of Post Telegraph Telephones, where ALBtelecom existed only as a government office.

Despite the difficulties in the works carried out until the end of the 1930s due to World War II, during this time an automatic exchange with about 1000 numbers was installed. The consequences of the war were also visible in the telephone communication sector, where many of the lines were damaged. During 1945, many of the telephone lines were rebuilt, while the Post and Telegraph offices were reopened to their pre-war levels.

August 1947 also marks the first establishment of the General Directorate of Post and Telecommunications, which was subordinate to the Ministry of World Affairs. Only a year earlier, in 1946, telephone communication with the world was established through the Tirana-Peshkopi line. During this period, inter-urban telephone service from booths also began for the first time. Given the growing need for communication, in 1965, Post and Telecommunication offices were opened in all localities of the country. This was achieved through direct telephone interconnection of all district centers with Tirana.

In the early 1970s, the Post and Telecommunications sector took another important step, enabling connections with villages. The 1980s and onwards also marked the increase in the flow of investments in expanding the capacities of exchanges in cities, strengthening and developing the technical base, and installing numbering system equipment, significantly facilitating the path of telephone communication.

The 1990s brought a new wave of changes in the field of telecommunications. On February 5, 1992, Albanian Telecom was established as a separate enterprise. During the 15-year period, the fixed-line telephone company also made investments in improving the network and providing new services. In the early 1996s, the public telephone service with a prepaid card was introduced. In 1997, the Fiber Optic cable was put into use, a more qualitative line for the transmission of international traffic.

In May 1996 ALBtelecom created Albanian Mobile Communications (Now One Albania) in March 2008 created another mobile telephony company called Eagle Mobile, which gained a 13% market share within a year. On 12th of February 1999, the company "Telekom Shqiptar" was transformed into Albtelecom.

In December 2021 4iG Plc acquired a 80.27% stake in Albtelecom from Calik Holding in an undisclosed deal. The transaction is expected to be finalized due to regulatory approval in January 2022. After the approval for the sale of ALBtelecom to 4iG Plc then the ownership was transferred to Antenna Hungária.

== Eagle Mobile ==
The merging process of ALBtelecom and Eagle Mobile began in March 2011. Although being part of the same package, the companies functioned as two different entities. In February 2013, the company ALBtelecom took possession of the mobile company, Eagle Mobile, which turned into a brand within ALBtelecom. The Electronic and Postal Communications Authority (EPCA - AKEP) has given ALBtelecom the license of transfer that allows the company to offer products and services of fixed telephony, and broadband internet, as well as mobile telephony and mobile broadband internet under the Eagle Mobile trademark.

Eagle Mobile entered the Albanian telecommunication market on 12 March 2008. Now the company covers 98.5% of the country's population and 92.5% of the national territory. The third operator helped in the market liberalization. Prices underwent a sharp decline of over 40% with its arrival.

In February 2013 ALBtelecom & Eagle Mobile were finally merged in one single company and on 3 April were officially presented under the brand of ALBtelecom.

During 2017 Eagle Mobile was replaced with ALBtelecom Mobile brand name.
