= Competition Authority (Albania) =

Government agency of Albania

- Autoriteti i Konkurrencës
- Official logo

Antitrust agency overview
- Formed: 1 March 2004
- Jurisdiction: Albania
- Headquarters: Tirana
- Antitrust agency executive: Juliana Latifi
- Website: caa.gov.al

The Competition Authority (AK) (Albanian: Autoriteti i Konkurrencës) is a government agency in Albania acting to ensure a free, effective and competitive market, pursuant to the Law "On Protection of Competition". The agency functions as a promoter and advocate of fair competition and consumer interests in the country, with the ultimate goal of generating the development of a healthy competitive market.

Prof. Dr Juliana Latifi was appointed by the government in 2016 to lead the organisation. She took over from Lindita Milo who had served her five year term of office. Latifi was proposed for the role by 28 members of parliament and she will serve for five years.
