= Electronic and Postal Communications Authority (Albania) =

Government agency of Albania

- Autoriteti i Komunikimeve Elektronike dhe Postare

Agency overview
- Jurisdiction: Albania
- Headquarters: Reshit Çollaku street, nr. 43, Tirana, Albania
- Agency executive: Tomi Frashëri, Chairman of the Steering Board
- Website: akep.al

The Electronic and Postal Communications Authority (Albanian: Autoriteti i Komunikimeve Elektronike dhe Postare, often abbreviated as AKEP) is the regulatory body in the electronic communications and postal services field, which supervises the regulatory framework provided for in the law on electronic communications and the law on postal services, and development policies defined by the Council of Ministers. The institutional role, functions, and competencies as a regulatory body in the electronic communications and postal services field are provided for in the material legislation on electronic communications and postal services in the Republic of Albania.

AKEP is a legal, public, non-budgetary entity, headed by the Steering Council, which is independent in making decisions and abides by its own adopted internal regulation. The Steering Council comprises 5 members appointed by the Parliament upon the proposal of the Council of Ministers. AKEP also manages the .al geographic top-level domain. Its office is located at Rr. Reshit Çollaku, Nr.43 in Tirana.
