= List of airports in Albania =

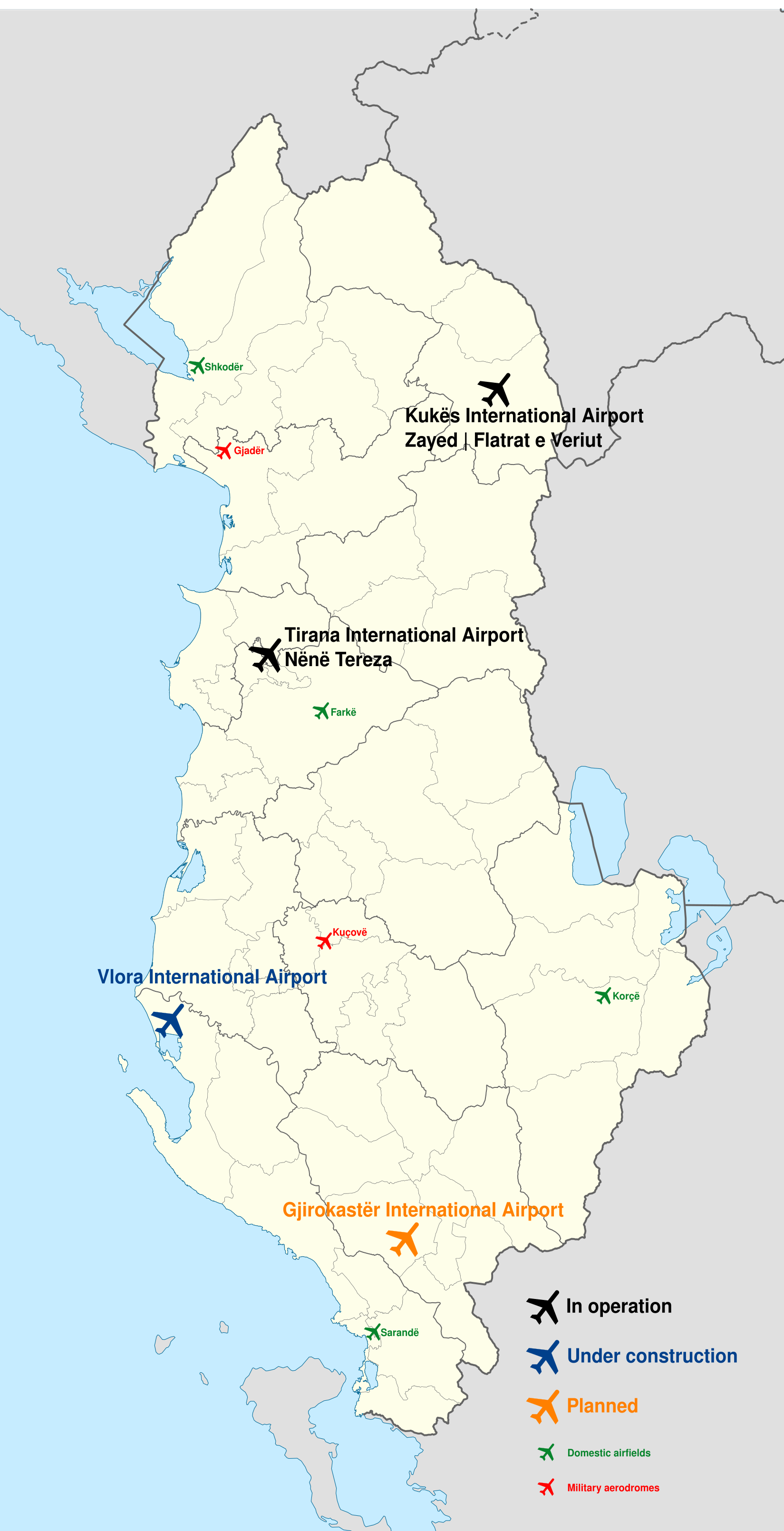
Map of airports in Albania

This is a list of airports in Albania, grouped by type and sorted by location.

Previously, a number of regional airports have been renovated but could not become functional for civil flights because of the 20 year monopoly held by Tirana International Airport's shareholder company over Albanian airspace that started in 2005. Following intensive negotiations to revise the contract terms to open airports for both domestic and external flights earlier, the Albanian government managed to reduce the concession period by 5 years, until 2020. After reaching the agreement with the Albanian Government to end its monopoly on international flights from Albania, Hochtief AirPort sold the operation of TIA to China Everbright Limited. However, in December of 2020 Kastrati Group took over the concession of the airport from China Everbright Limited for 71 million euros.

Kukës International Airport opened on 9 July 2021, marking the end of the monopoly on international flights in Albania after 15 years, when the first ever international commercial flight Helvetic Airways Flight 8174 arrived from Zurich Airport.

On 28 November 2021, construction work began to build Albania's third airport, Vlora International Airport. The international tender was won by a consortium made up of Behgjet Pacolli's Mabco Constructions, the Turkish YDA Group and the Kosovar 2A Group Shpk and the contract was signed on 20 April 2021. The airport is expected to welcome its first passengers in summer 2025. There have been environmental concerns however, with the airport being built inside the Vjosa-Narta Protected Area, in contradiction to national laws and international biodiversity protection conventions that Albania has ratified.

In January 2024 the minister of infrastructure of Albania Belinda Balluku said in a press conference that Albanias 4th airport will be built in the existing airfield of Gjirokastër, instead of Sarandë as previously stated in 2022 by prime minister Edi Rama. The reason cited for this was the already existing infrastructure which connects the two cities within 45 minutes. She also noted that the tender procedures for the construction of the new airport are set to open within the first half of 2024.

== Airports ==
Name	Image	Location	Airport code(s)		Runway	Passenger traffic (2023)		Operator	Built
Name	Image	Location	IATA	ICAO	Runway	total	% increase	Operator	Built
Tirana International Airport Nënë Tereza		Rinas; 41.4147°N 19.7206°E	TIA	LATI	2,750 m (9,020 ft)	7,257,634	+40%	Tirana International Airport Sh.p.k / Kastrati Group	1957 ↓ 2007
Kukës International Airport Zayed		Shtiqën; 42.0337°N 20.4158°E	KFZ	LAKU	2,198 m (7,211 ft)	22,554	-43%	Kukës Municipality / Bami Sh.p.k / Global Technical Mechanics Sh.p.k	2005 ↓ 2021
Vlora International Airport		Novoselë; 40.6071°N 19.4282°E	VLO	LAVL	3,200 m (10,500 ft)	—	—	Mabetex Group	2025

== Domestic airfields ==
Name	Image	Location	Airport code(s)		Runway	Built
Name	Image	Location	IATA	ICAO	Runway	Built
Gjirokastër Airfield		Gjirokastër; 40.0873°N 20.1531°E	—	LAGK	1,347 m (4,419 ft)	1929
Korçë Airfield		Lumalas; 40.6457°N 20.7415°E	—	LAKO	2,278 m (7,474 ft)	1924
Sarandë Airfield		Finiq; 39°52′43″N 20°2′9″E	—	LASR	—	—
Shkodër Airfield		Shtoj; 42°5′21.7″N 19°30′32.8″E	—	LASK	424 m (1,391 ft)	—
Farkë Heliport		Farkë; 41.3155°N 19.8855°E	—	LAFK	30 m (98 ft)	—

== Military aerodromes ==
Name	Image	Location	Airport code(s)		Runway	Built
Name	Image	Location	IATA	ICAO	Runway	Built
Kuçovë Aerodrome		Kuçovë; 40.7719°N 19.9019°E	—	LAKV	2,853 m (9,360 ft)	1952
Gjadër Aerodrome		Gjadër; 41.8952°N 19.5987°E	—	LAGJ	2,800 m (9,200 ft)	1974

== See also ==
- Transport in Albania
- Albanian Air Force
- List of airports by ICAO code: L#LA – Albania
- Wikipedia: WikiProject Aviation/Airline destination lists: Europe#Albania
