= List of bridges in Kosovo =

This list of bridges in Kosovo lists bridges of particular historical, scenic, architectural or engineering interest. Road and railway bridges, viaducts, aqueducts and footbridges are included.

== Historical and architectural interest bridges ==
	Name	Albanian	Distinction	Length	Type	Carries Crosses	Opened	Location	District	Ref.
1	Terzijski Bridge	Ura e Terzive	Cultural Heritage site of Kosovo	190 m (620 ft)	Masonry; 11 semi-circular arches	Erenik	15th century	Bishtazhin; 42°21′33.0″N 20°30′34.5″E	Gjakova	
2	Stone Bridge, Vushtrri	Ura e Vjetër e Gurit	Cultural Heritage site of Kosovo	135 m (443 ft)	Masonry; 9 arches (5 pointed and 4 semi-circular arches)	Sitnica	15th century	Vushtrri; 42°49′24.0″N 20°57′36.1″E	Mitrovica	
3	Old Stone Bridge, Prizren	Ura e vjetër e gurit	Cultural Heritage site of Kosovo		Masonry; 3 semi-circular arches	Lumbardhi i Prizrenit	16th century	Prizren; 42°12′34.4″N 20°44′26.2″E	Prizren	
4	Fshajt Bridge	Ura e Fshejtë	Cultural Heritage site of Kosovo	70 m (230 ft)	Arch; Concrete deck arch	Road bridge White Drin Canyon	18th century	Fshajt; 42°21′09.7″N 20°32′27.8″E	Gjakova	

== Major road and railway bridges ==
This table presents the structures with spans greater than 100 meters (non-exhaustive list).

	Name	Albanian	Span	Length	Type	Carries Crosses	Opened	Location	District	Ref.
1	Gazivode Bridge	Ura e Gazivodës	219 m (719 ft)	323 m (1,060 ft)	Arch; Steel through arch	Road bridge Gazivoda Lake; Ibar (river)	1989	Brnjak–Vitkoviće; 42°58′09.9″N 20°32′19.3″E	Mitrovica; Serbia	

== See also ==
- Transport in Kosovo
- Roads in Kosovo
- Kosovo Railways
- Geography of Kosovo
