= Tirana International Airport Nënë Tereza =

International airport serving Tirana, Albania

Tirana International Airport Nënë Tereza Aeroporti Ndërkombëtar i Tiranës Nënë Tereza

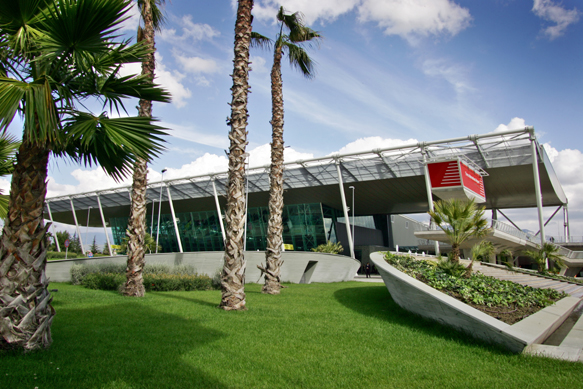
- IATA: TIA; ICAO: LATI

Summary
- Airport type: Public
- Owner/Operator: Kastrati Aviation Holding via Tirana International Airport SHPK
- Serves: Tirana, Tirana County, Albania
- Location: Rinas, Durrës County, Albania
- Operating base for: Ryanair; Wizz Air
- Elevation AMSL: 108 ft (33 m)
- Coordinates: 41°24′53″N 19°43′14″E
- Website: www.tirana-airport.com

Map
- Location in Albania Location in the Mediterranean Location in Europe

Runways
Direction	Length		Surface
Direction	m	ft	Surface
17/35	3,000	9,842	Asphalt

Statistics (2025)
- Passengers: 11,640,044
- Passenger change 24–25: ▲9%
- Aircraft movements: 69,896
- Movements change 24–25: ▲2%
- Source: Albanian AIP at EUROCONTROL LATI Airport record

Tirana International Airport Nënë Tereza (Albanian: Aeroporti Ndërkombëtar i Tiranës Nënë Tereza, IATA: TIA, ICAO: LATI), also known as Rinas International Airport, is an international airport serving Tirana, the capital of Albania. The airport is named after the Albanian Roman Catholic nun and missionary, Mother Teresa (1910–1997). It is located 6 nautical miles (11 kilometres; 6.9 miles) northwest of Tirana, in the municipality of Krujë, Durrës County.

It is currently the only airport in Albania with scheduled commercial passenger flights, while Kukës and Vlora International Airports are inactive as of April 2026. It is one of the busiest Balkan airports after reaching 10 million passengers in 2024, compared to around 3.3 million in 2019. On 9 December 2024, the airport celebrated a major milestone by surpassing 10 million passengers.

== History ==
=== Early development ===
The present airport infrastructure at Rinas was constructed between 1955 and 1957. However, Tirana had been served by commercial aviation several decades earlier. Domestic air transport in Albania began in 1926, when the German airline Adria Aero Lloyd was granted a monopoly over internal air routes and commenced services linking Tirana with Shkodër, Korçë, and Vlorë. These operations proved financially unsustainable, and the airline subsequently transferred its rights to the Italian carrier Ala Littoria, which from 1935 operated regular domestic routes connecting Tirana with Shkodër, Kukës, Peshkopia, Kuçova, Vlorë, and Gjirokastër. In 1938, the Yugoslav airline Aeroput introduced scheduled international services linking Tirana with Belgrade, with an intermediate stop in Dubrovnik, thereby integrating Albania into the regional Balkan air network on a limited scale. Following the Second World War and the establishment of an isolationist communist regime, international air transport to and from Albania became highly restricted. Between 1944 and 1948, limited services operated between Tirana and Belgrade, but after the rupture of relations with Yugoslavia, Albania's only scheduled international connection until 1953 consisted of infrequent flights to Budapest operated by the Soviet–Hungarian airline Maszovlet. From 1953 to early 1955, no regular civil air services operated. In February 1955, flights to Moscow were inaugurated, followed by connections to other Eastern European capitals, reflecting Albania's alignment within the socialist bloc. During the 1970s, Tirana was served by China's CAAC Airlines through a weekly long-haul service to Beijing via Bucharest and Tehran. By the late 1980s, a total of six airlines operated scheduled services to Tirana, offering approximately nine international round-trip flights per week. Following the collapse of the communist regime in 1991 and the liberalisation of international travel for Albanian citizens, air traffic expanded rapidly. By 1999, Tirana Airport recorded 8,249 aircraft movements and 356,823 passengers, representing a sevenfold increase in traffic compared with 1991 levels. Passenger volumes continued to rise steadily during the 2000s, exceeding 1.5 million annually by 2010, and reaching two million passengers per year by 2016. Growth accelerated markedly after 2020, with traffic surpassing 7.2 million passengers in 2023 and exceeding 10 million passengers in 2024, reflecting a sustained long-term expansion of civil aviation activity in Albania.

=== Contemporary ===
The air traffic equipment and facilities of Tirana International Airport Nënë Tereza have undergone extensive modernisation since the mid-2000s, following investments by Tirana International Airport SHPK, a consortium led by Hochtief AirPort. Hochtief assumed management of the airport on 23 April 2005 under a 20-year concession agreement structured as a build–own–operate–transfer (BOOT) arrangement. The concession programme included the construction of a completely new passenger terminal and a range of supporting infrastructure works, including a new access road, expanded parking facilities, and a bridge over the former airport access route. These investments significantly increased the airport's handling capacity, with passenger numbers reaching approximately 1.5 million by 2009 and exceeding that level in 2010. The terminal building, its subsequent expansion, the cargo facilities, associated landscaping, and car-park canopies were designed by Malaysian architect Hin Tan of Hintan. Passenger traffic continued to grow steadily in the following decade. In 2016, the airport reported serving two million passengers within a single calendar year for the first time. Growth accelerated markedly after the COVID-19 pandemic. In 2023, Tirana International Airport handled more than 7.2 million passengers, representing a substantial increase compared with both 2022 and pre-pandemic traffic levels in 2019. This trend continued in 2024, when the airport exceeded 10 million passengers for the first time, reflecting sustained expansion in airline operations and route connectivity. In 2025, it handled a record 11.6 million passengers, continuing its rapid growth in passenger traffic, driven by expanding airline networks and tourism.

== Ownership ==
In 2017, China Everbright Limited became the sole owner of Tirana International Airport Nënë Tereza after acquiring the airport operator from Hochtief AirPort. The transaction followed an agreement with the Albanian Government to terminate the airport's long-standing monopoly on international flights from Albania. China Everbright Limited is an international financial services group active in asset management, direct investment, brokerage, and investment banking. On 25 December 2020, Kastrati Group acquired 100% of the shares of Tirana International Airport Nënë Tereza from China Everbright Limited for a reported price of €71 million, becoming the airport's owner and operator through its aviation subsidiary, Kastrati Aviation Holding, via Tirana International Airport SHPK.

== Airlines and destinations ==
The following airlines operate regular year-round and seasonal scheduled and charter flights to and from Tirana:

Airlines	Destinations
Aegean Airlines	Athens, Heraklion; Seasonal: Rhodes
AJet	Istanbul–Sabiha Gökçen; Seasonal: Ankara; Seasonal charter: Antalya, Bodrum, Dalaman
airBaltic	Seasonal: Riga, Tallinn
Air Cairo	Seasonal charter: Cairo
Air France	Seasonal: Paris–Charles de Gaulle
Air Montenegro	Seasonal charter: Bratislava, Brno
Air Serbia	Belgrade
Air Transat	Seasonal: Toronto–Pearson
Arkia	Seasonal: Tel Aviv
Austrian Airlines	Vienna
British Airways	London–Heathrow
Buzz	Seasonal charter: Katowice, Olsztyn, Poznań, Rzeszów, Wrocław, Zielona Góra
Chair Airlines	Seasonal: Zurich
easyJet	Geneva; Seasonal: Lisbon
Electra Airways	Seasonal charter: Brno, České Budějovice, Katowice, Ostrava, Pardubice
Enter Air	Seasonal charter: Gdańsk, Katowice, Porto, Poznań
Eurowings	Düsseldorf; Seasonal: Cologne/Bonn, Stuttgart
Finnair	Seasonal: Helsinki
Flydubai	Dubai–International
Flynas	Seasonal: Riyadh
FlyOne Armenia	Seasonal: Yerevan
Freebird Airlines	Seasonal charter: Antalya, Bodrum
Iberia	Seasonal: Madrid
Israir	Seasonal: Tel Aviv
ITA Airways	Seasonal: Rome–Fiumicino
Jordan Aviation	Seasonal charter: Amman-Queen Alia
LOT Polish Airlines	Warsaw-Chopin; Seasonal charter: Katowice, Wrocław
Lufthansa	Frankfurt; Seasonal: Munich
Luxair	Luxembourg (begins 29 March 2027)
Norwegian Air Shuttle	Seasonal: Copenhagen, Gothenburg, Helsinki, Oslo
Pegasus Airlines	Istanbul–Sabiha Gökçen; Seasonal: Antalya
Ryanair	Bari, Beauvais, Bergamo, Birmingham, Bologna, Bratislava, Bucharest–Otopeni, Budapest, Catania, Charleroi, Cologne/Bonn, Dublin, Edinburgh, Eindhoven, Gdańsk, Genoa, Karlsruhe/Baden-Baden, Kraków, Lamezia Terme, Leeds/Bradford (begins 28 March 2027), Liverpool, London–Stansted, Madrid, Malta, Manchester, Marseille, Memmingen, Milan–Malpensa, Naples, Palermo, Parma, Pescara, Pisa, Poznań, Prague, Rimini, Rome–Ciampino, Stockholm–Arlanda, Treviso, Trieste, Turin, Verona, Vienna, Warsaw–Chopin, Warsaw–Modlin, Weeze, Wrocław; Seasonal: Alghero, Katowice
Scandinavian Airlines	Seasonal: Copenhagen, Stockholm-Arlanda
SkyUp Airlines	Seasonal: Chișinău
Sky Express	Athens, Heraklion
Smartwings	Seasonal: Prague; Seasonal charter: Bratislava, Budapest, Debrecen, Łódź, Poznań, Warsaw-Chopin
SunExpress	Seasonal: Antalya, Bodrum
Sundor	Tel Aviv
Swiss International Air Lines	Zurich
TAROM	Seasonal charter: Bucharest-Otopeni, Cluj-Napoca
Transavia	Seasonal: Amsterdam, Bordeaux, Lyon, Marseille (begins 11 July 2027), Nantes, Paris-Orly
TUI fly Belgium	Seasonal: Brussels
TUI fly Netherlands	Seasonal: Amsterdam
Turkish Airlines	Istanbul
Wizz Air	Ancona, Athens, Barcelona, Bari, Basel/Mulhouse, Beauvais, Bergamo, Berlin, Billund, Bologna, Bratislava, Budapest, Charleroi, Catania, Cologne/Bonn, Dortmund, Eindhoven, Genoa, Hahn, Hamburg, Karlsruhe/Baden-Baden, London–Gatwick, London–Luton, Lyon, Madrid, Málaga, Malmö, Malta, Memmingen, Milan–Malpensa, Naples, Nuremberg, Palermo, Perugia, Pescara, Pisa, Prague, Rimini, Rome–Fiumicino, Stockholm–Arlanda, Stuttgart, Treviso, Trieste, Turin, Verona; Seasonal: Alghero, Comiso, Gdańsk, Katowice, Kraków, Nice, Palma de Mallorca, Poznań, Salerno (begins 6 June 2027), Sandefjord, Santander, Tallinn, Valencia, Vilnius, Warsaw–Chopin, Warsaw–Radom, Wrocław

== Statistics ==
=== Traffic ===
Year	Passengers	Change	Aircraft operations	Change	Cargo (metric tons)	Change	Ref.
2005	785,000	▲20.77%	15,400	N.A.	N.A.	N.A.	
2006	906,103	▲15.43%	15,856	▲2.96%	2,435	N.A.	
2007	1,105,770	▲22.04%	18,258	▲15.15%	3,832	▲57.37%	
2008	1,267,041	▲14.58%	19,194	▲5.13%	2,497	▼34.84%	
2009	1,394,688	▲10.07%	20,064	▲4.53%	2,265	▼9.29%	
2010	1,536,822	▲10.19%	20,768	▲3.51%	2,355	▲3.97%	
2011	1,817,073	▲18.24%	22,988	▲10.69%	2,656	▲12.78%	
2012	1,665,331	▼8.35%	20,528	▼10.70%	1,875	▼29.41%	
2013	1,757,342	▲5.53%	19,942	▼2.85%	2,164	▲15.41%	
2014	1,810,305	▲3.02%	17,928	▼3.02%	2,324	▲13.53%	
2015	1,997,044	▲10.3%	20,876	▲16.4%	2,229	▼4.1%	
2016	2,195,100	▲9.9%	22,352	▲7.1%	2,200	▼1%	
2017	2,630,338	▲19.8%	24,336	▲9%	2,266	▲3%	
2018	2,947,172	▲12%	25,462	▲3%	2,245	▼0.9%	
2019	3,338,147	▲13.3%	28,695	▲12.5%	2,372	▲5.7%	
2020	1,310,614	▼60,7%	15,280	▼46,8%	1,796.8	▼24.3%	
2021	2,923,533	▲123.1%	26,152	▲73%	1,983	▲10.4%	
2022	5,198,550	▲77.8%	38,517	▲47.3%	2,045	▲3.1%	
2023	7,257,662	▲39.6%	51,050	▲32.5%	1,953	▼4.5%	
2024	10,708,975	▲48%	68,346	▲35%	2,257	▲18%	
2025	11,640,044	▲8.7%	69,896	▲2.3%	2,805	▲24.3%	
2026 (30.09)	10,819,926	▲20%	62,808	▲15%	1,778	▲1%	

=== Busiest routes ===
Routes with the highest number of passengers (2025)
Rank	Destination	Airport(s)	Number of passengers	Top carriers
1	Milan	BGY, MXP	1,022,161	Ryanair, Wizz Air
2	London	LGW, LHR, LTN, STN	933,098	British Airways, Ryanair, Wizz Air
3	Rome	CIA, FCO	587,812	ITA Airways, Ryanair, Wizz Air
4	Bologna	BLQ	505,558	Ryanair, Wizz Air
5	Treviso	TSF	464,857	Ryanair, Wizz Air
6	Vienna	VIE	442,643	Austrian Airlines, Ryanair
7	Istanbul	IST, SAW	424,585	Pegasus Airlines, Turkish Airlines
8	Pisa	PSA	401,156	Ryanair, Wizz Air
9	Athens	ATH	374,627	Aegean Airlines, Sky Express, Wizz Air
10	Bari	BRI	365,934	Ryanair, Wizz Air

Highest number of passengers by country (2025)
Rank	Destination	Number of passengers
1	Italy	4,659,170
2	Germany	1,556,384
3	United Kingdom	1,017,122
4	France	587,125
5	Turkey	586,837
6	Poland	485,978
7	Austria	442,643
8	Greece	400,175
9	Belgium	358,115
10	Spain	355,214

=== Top carriers ===
Top carriers by market share at Tirana Airport (2025)
Rank	Carrier	Market share
1	Wizz Air	54.33%
2	Ryanair	21.86%
3	Lufthansa	2.86%
4	Pegasus Airlines	2.54%
5	Air Albania (now defunct)	2.33%

== Ground transport ==
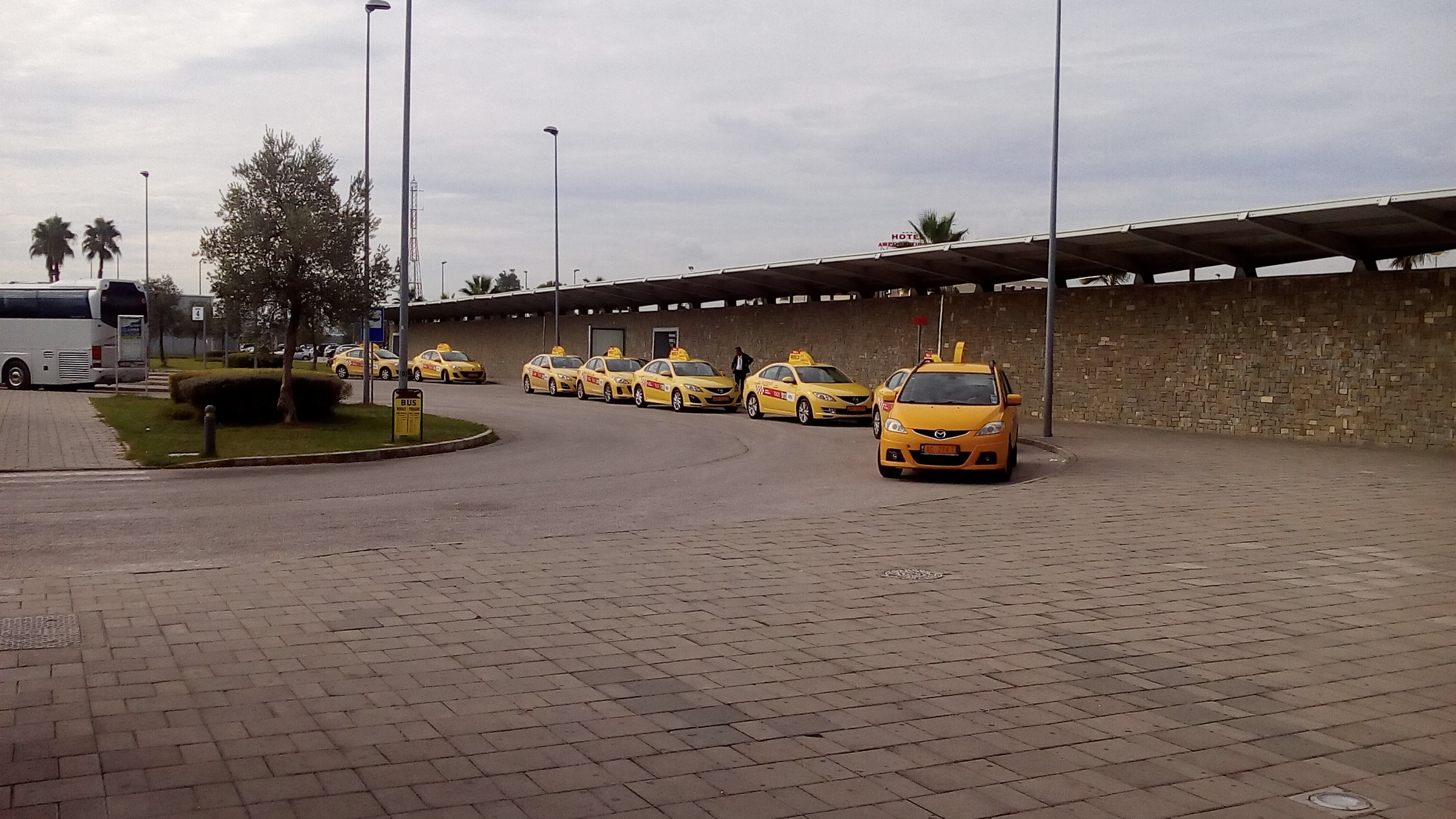
Taxi rank at the airport

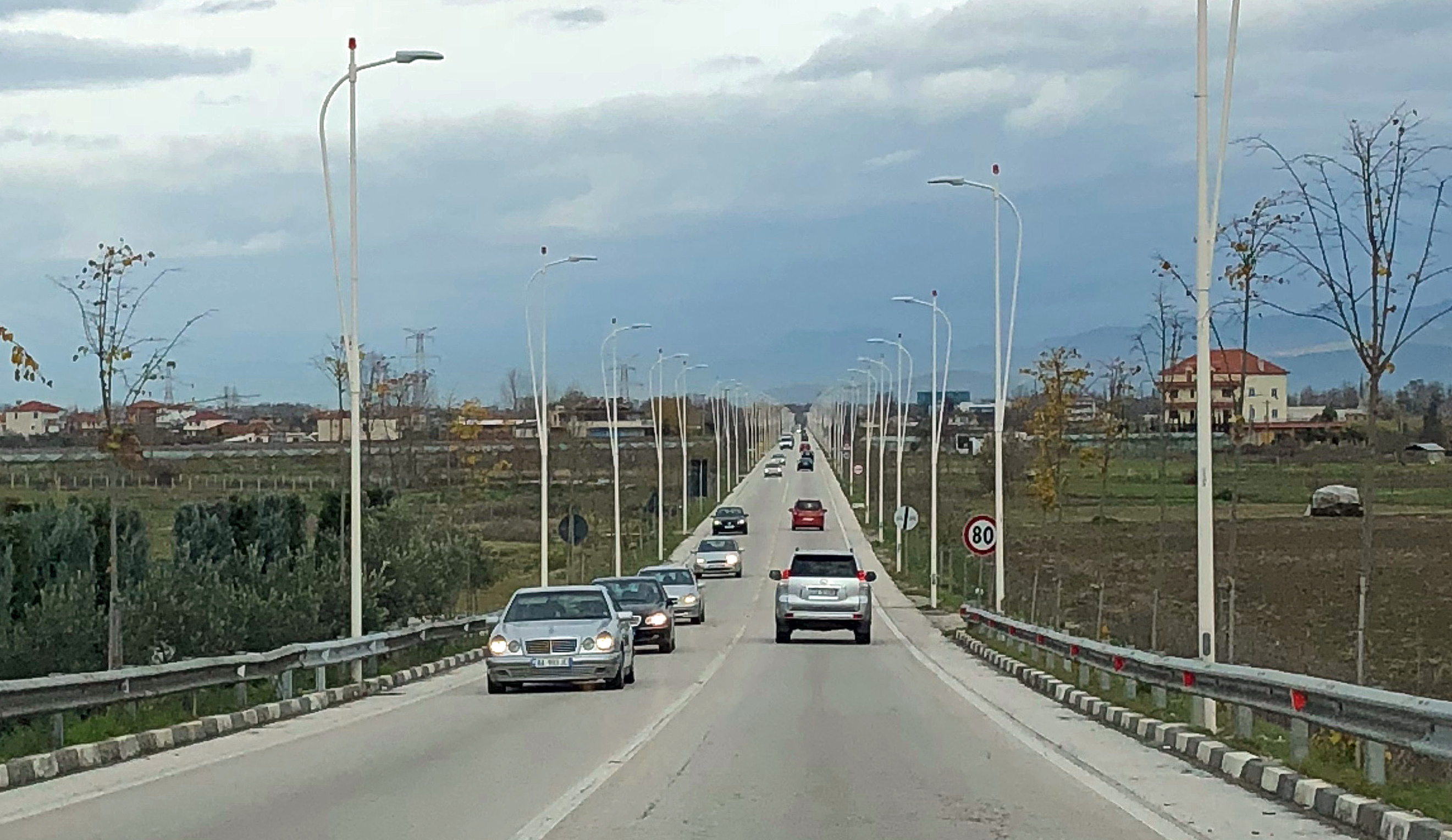
SH60 linking Tirana Airport with the SH2 Tirana–Durrës highway

Tirana International Airport Nënë Tereza is connected to the national road network via SH60, which links the airport to the SH2 Durrës–Tirana highway and provides access to the A1 corridor. Since 2024, road connectivity has been improved through upgraded junctions and access roads serving the airport area. Taxis and car rental services are available at the terminal, and the journey between central Tirana and the airport typically takes 20–25 minutes, depending on traffic conditions.

=== Bus ===
An airport bus service operates between the airport and Tirana city centre, with stops located outside the arrivals terminal. The service runs 24 hours a day, seven days a week, with departures approximately every hour.

=== Rail ===
A new electrified railway line linking Tirana, Durrës, and the airport is under development. The project includes a dedicated airport station and is planned to begin operations with electric trains in early 2027, providing the first direct rail connection between the airport and Albania's main urban centres.

== Incidents and accidents ==
- 3 October 2006: Turkish Airlines Flight 1476, flying from Tirana to Istanbul, was hijacked by Hakan Ekinci in Greek airspace. The aircraft, with 107 passengers and six crew on board, transmitted two coded hijack signals which were picked up by the Greek air force; the flight was intercepted by military aircraft and landed safely at Brindisi, Italy.
- 30 June 2016: Three armed and masked people entered the cargo terminal, where they stole a huge amount of money that was to be transported abroad on airplanes. The amount of cash could have been up to 3 million euros. The incident caused national security concerns.
- 9 April 2019: An Austrian Airlines flight headed to Vienna was delayed for three hours, following an armed robbery. The aircraft's engines were running, when three men wearing masks and military fatigues stepped up to the fuselage, stealing 6 million euros. One of the robbers was shot dead in an exchange of fire with the police about one kilometre from the airport.

== See also ==
- Transport in Albania
- List of airports in Albania
  - Kukës International Airport Zayed
  - Vlora International Airport
