= Farkë Heliport =

- IATA: none; ICAO: LAFK

Summary
- Airport type: Public
- Serves: Tiranë
- Location: Albania
- Elevation AMSL: 69 ft / 21 m
- Coordinates: 41°18′39.8″N 19°52′47.9″E

Map
- Location of Tiranë Heliport in Albania

Helipads
Number	Length		Surface
Number	m	ft	Surface
1	30	98	ASPHALT
- Source: Landings.com

Farkë Heliport (ICAO: LAFK) is a public use heliport located in Farkë, 2 nautical miles east-southeast of Tirana, Albania. The estimated terrain elevation above sea level is 207 metres.

== See also ==
- List of airports in Albania
