= VLO =

VLO may refer to:

- V_{LO}, The maximum landing gear operating speed
- VLo, The thalamus region of the brain
- VLo, vacuum solder system，Centrotherm products VLO6, VLO12, VLO20, VLO180, and VLO300. The size below 20 liter is application for institutes, universities. The size above 180 liter is application for manufacturing.
- Valero Energy, an oil company which trades on the NYSE as VLO
- VLO, the IATA code for Vlora International Airport
