= Sarandë Airfield =

Airport in Vlorë, Albania

- IATA: none; ICAO: LASR

Summary
- Airport type: Public
- Serves: Sarandë
- Location: Albania
- Elevation AMSL: 112 ft / 34 m
- Coordinates: 39°52′43″N 20°2′9″E

Map
- Location of Sarandë Airport in Albania
- Source: Landings.com

Sarandë Airfield (ICAO: LASR) is a public use airfield located 3.7 kilometres east of Sarandë, Vlorë, Albania.

As of 2023, most public domain sources consider the field as abandoned, based upon satellite imagery.

== See also ==
- List of airports in Albania
