= Gjirokastër Airfield =

Airport in Gjirokastër, Albania

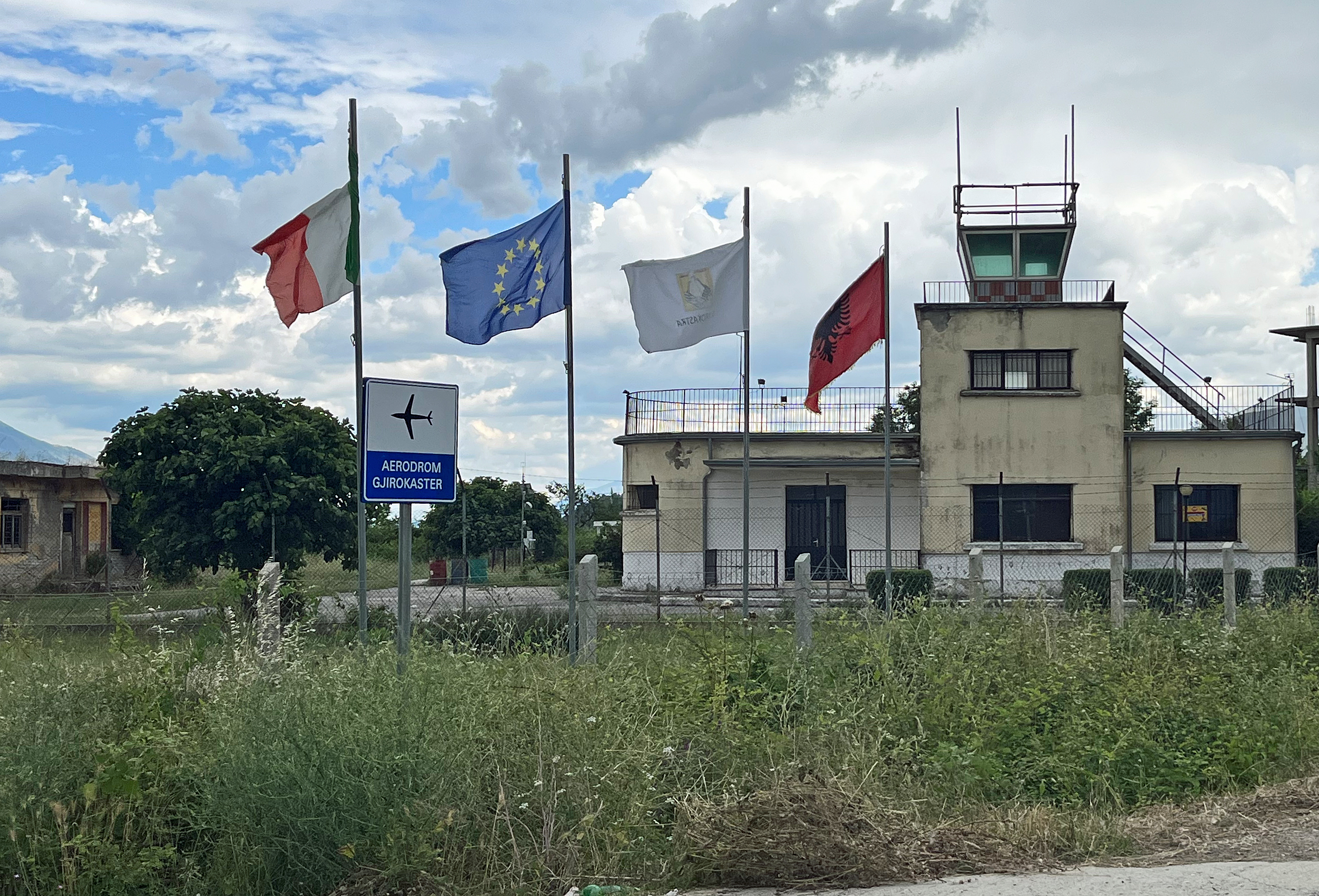
- IATA: N/A; ICAO: LAGK

Summary
- Airport type: Public
- Owner: Municipality of Gjirokastër
- Serves: Gjirokastër
- Location: Albania
- Elevation AMSL: 666 ft / 203 m
- Coordinates: 40°5′16.4″N 20°9′6.9″E

Map
- Location of Gjirokastër Airport in Albania

Runways
Direction	Length		Surface
Direction	ft	m	Surface
14/32	4,420	1,347	GRASS

Gjirokastër Airfield is an airfield located near Gjirokastër, Gjirokastër, Albania.

== History ==
The airfield was initially put in operation in 1929 when there were scheduled domestic flights between Gjirokastër and Tirana and was mainly used for public and military purposes. The airfield is located about 1 km (0.62 mi) east of the city of Gjirokastër. The last aircraft to land was a state-owned plane dating back to 26 February 1991, when the former Albanian president Ramiz Alia was visiting Gjirokastra for the last time. Several attempts have been made to revive the airfield and in 2021 6 light aircraft from North Macedonia and Kosovo landed successfully at the airfield. The aim is to turn the airfield into an air sport and tourism destination throughout the year. Eventually, the airfield was certified for touristic and sportive purposes by the Civil Aviation Authority in July 2022 and it was assigned the code LAGK.

== Development ==
In January 2024 the vice prime minister and minister of infrastructure of Albania, Ms Belinda Balluku, advised that the new airport in south Albania will be built in the existing airfield of Gjrokaster aerodrome.

== See also ==
- List of airports in Albania
