= Fshajt Bridge =

Fshajt Bridge / Sacred Bridge
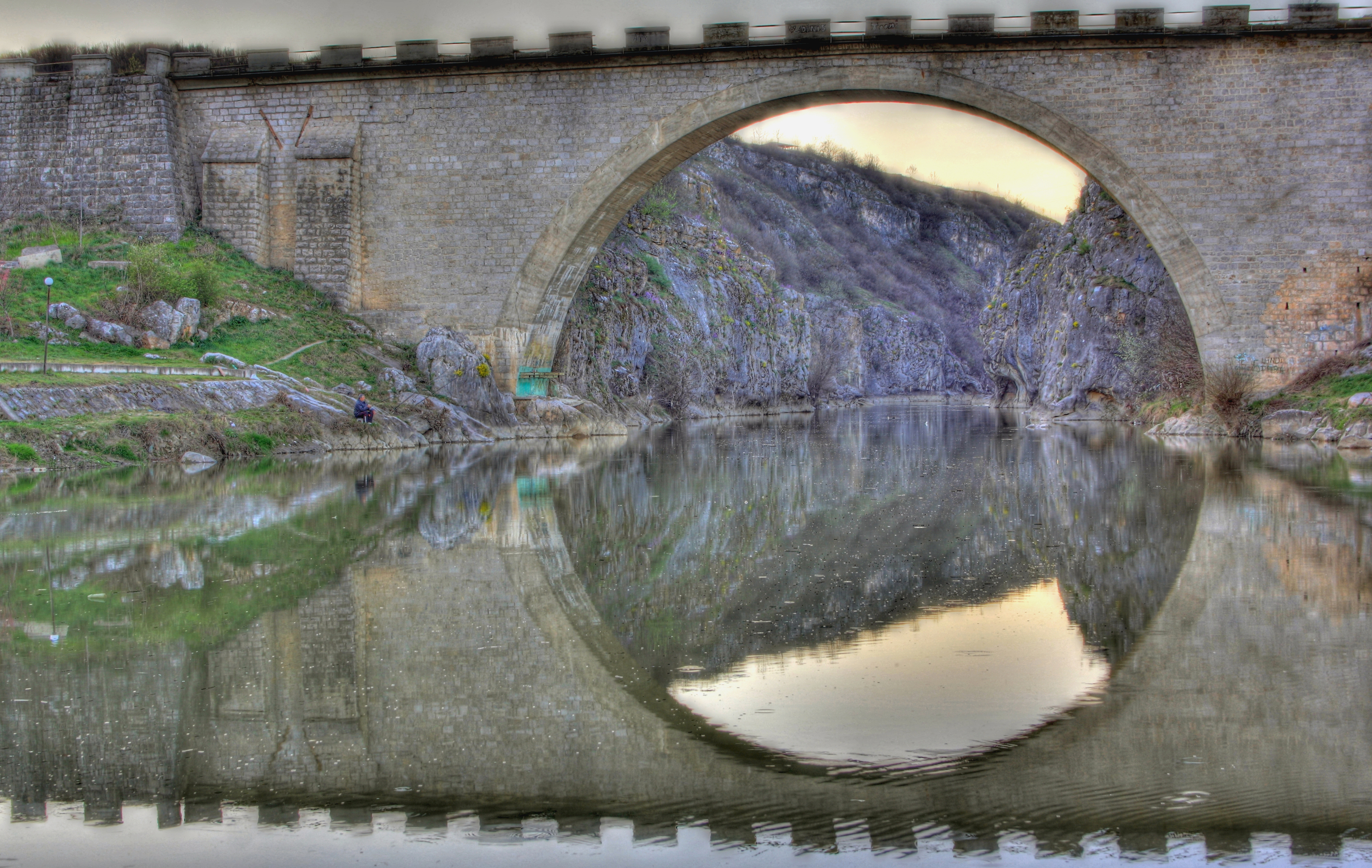
- Fshajt bridge over the White Drin river
- Coordinates: 42°21′09.7″N 20°32′27.9″E
- Carries: Cars
- Crosses: White Drin
- Locale: Gjakova, Kosovo

Characteristics
- Design: Arch
- Total length: 70 m (230 ft)
- Width: 7 m (23 ft)
- Height: 22 m (72 ft)

History
- Opened: 18th century

Fshajt Bridge or Sacred Bridge (Albanian: Ura e Fshejtë or Ura e Shenjtë; Serbian: Švanjski most / Швањски мост) is an 18th-century stone bridge with one arch over the White Drin Canyon in the western Kosovo. It is located in the village of Fshaj, on the way from Gjakova to Prizren. The bridge is 22 m (72 ft) high, 7 m (23 ft) wide and about 70 m (230 ft) long. Along with the White Drin Canyon, the Fshajt's Bridge is legally protected since 1986.

== History ==
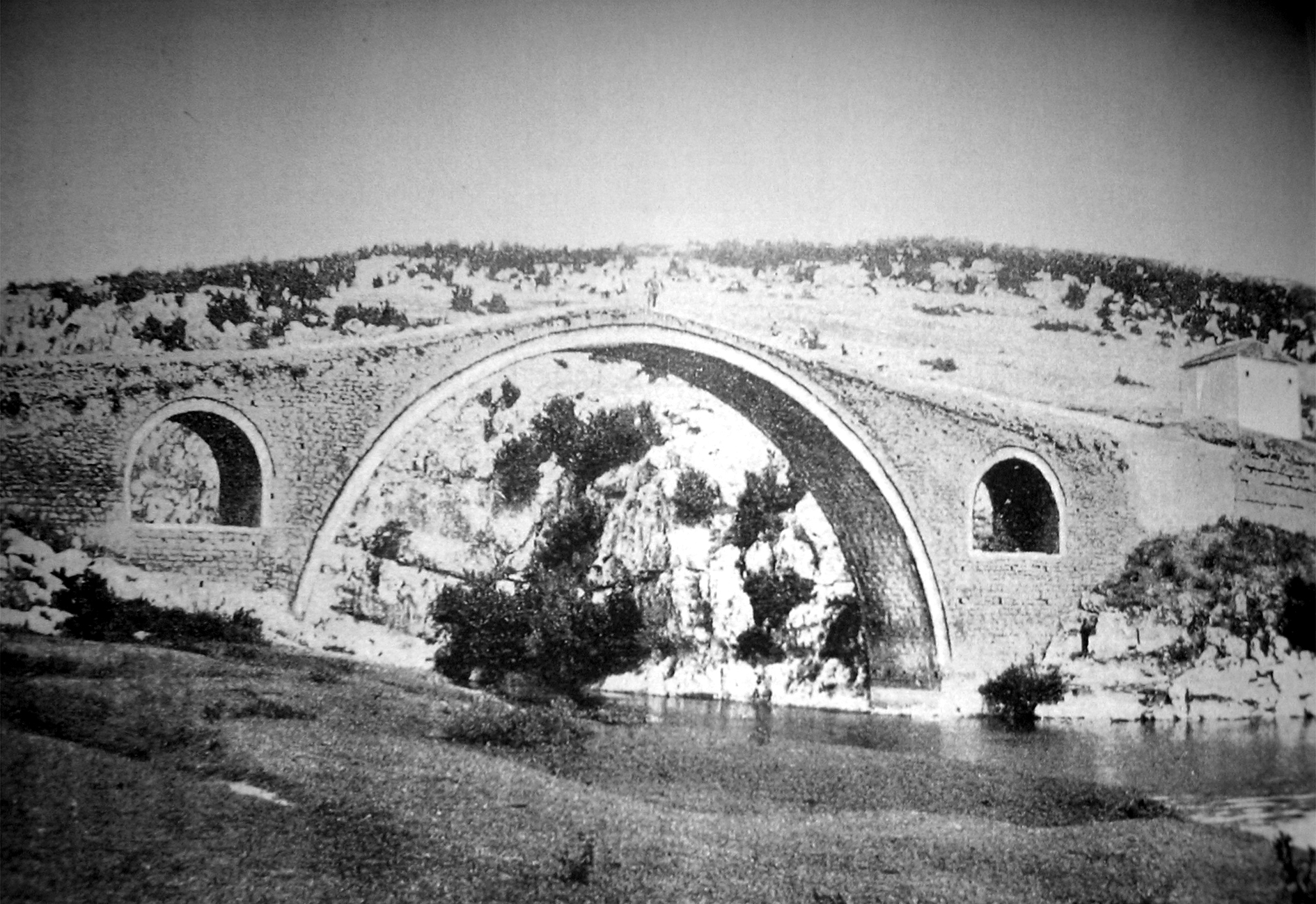
The Fshajt Bridge - old picture

The Fshajt's Bridge that was built on White Drin River, dates back to the 18th century. During the First World War it was destroyed completely, but in 1942 it was rebuilt again. During the war of Kosovo in 1999 it was damaged, but it was restored by the Italian Kosovo Force (KFOR). Nowadays, the bridge that links the banks of the White Drin river, represents a key point for the transport in the road that links the city of Gjakova and Prizren.

== Tourism ==
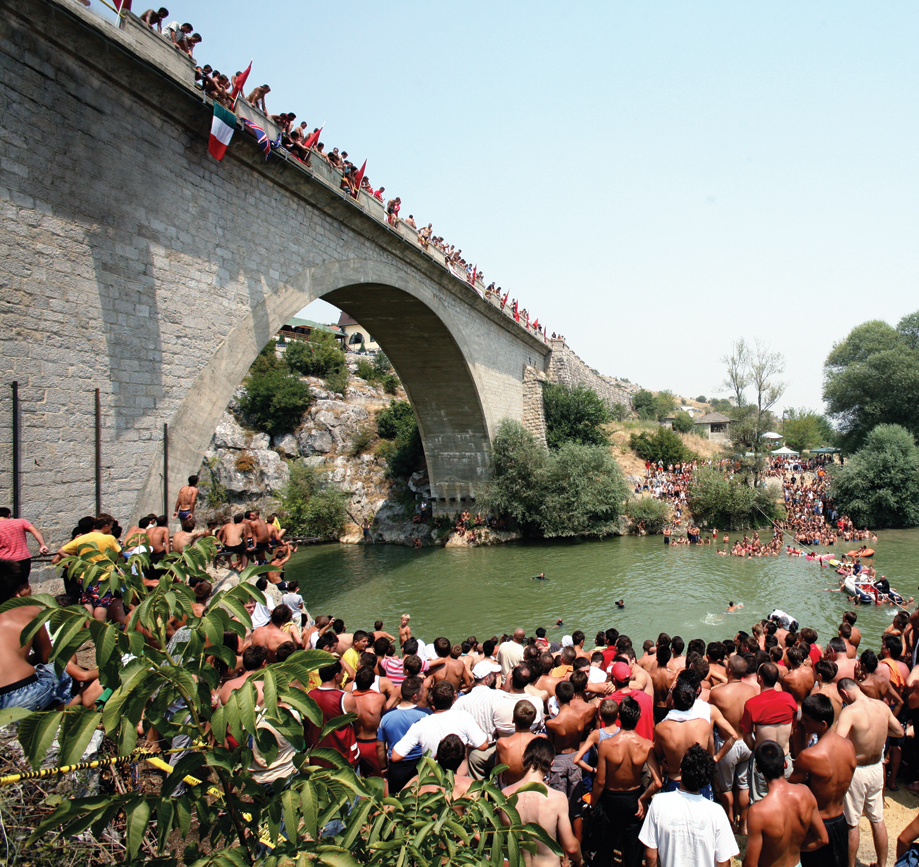
High-diving in the Fshajt Bridge

Located at the mouth of the White Drin Canyon, the bridge has become a popular attraction for the locals and foreign visitors. During the summer months the banks of the White Drin at Fshajt Bridge becomes a popular destination with many families camping alongside the stretch of water. Close to the bridge there are two rocks known as "Eagle Rock" (Shkëmbi i Shqiponjës) and "Skanderbeg Rock" (Shkëmbi i Skenderbeut), which features an engraving of 15th-century Albanian nobleman George Kastrioti Skanderbeg. The portrait of Skanderbeg was painted in the rock in 1968 by Mexhid Yvejsi on the occasion of the 500th anniversary of his death.

A traditional high-diving competition dating back to 1954 resumed in 2014 for the first time since 1999. The annual competition is attended by many local and regional competitors who show their skills in traditional jumping into river from the bridge.

== Gallery ==
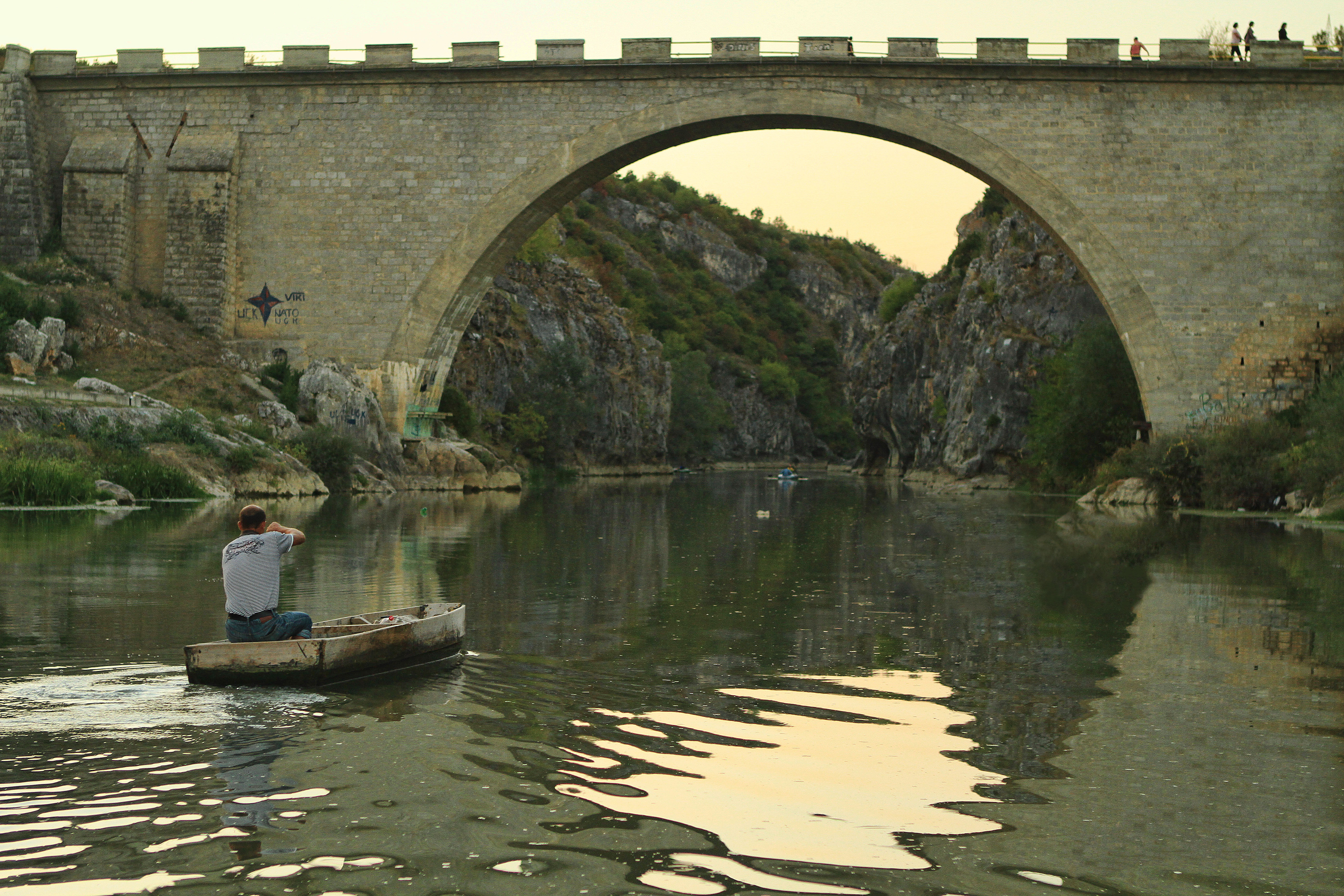
A boat at the mouth of the Fshajt Bridge and the canyon

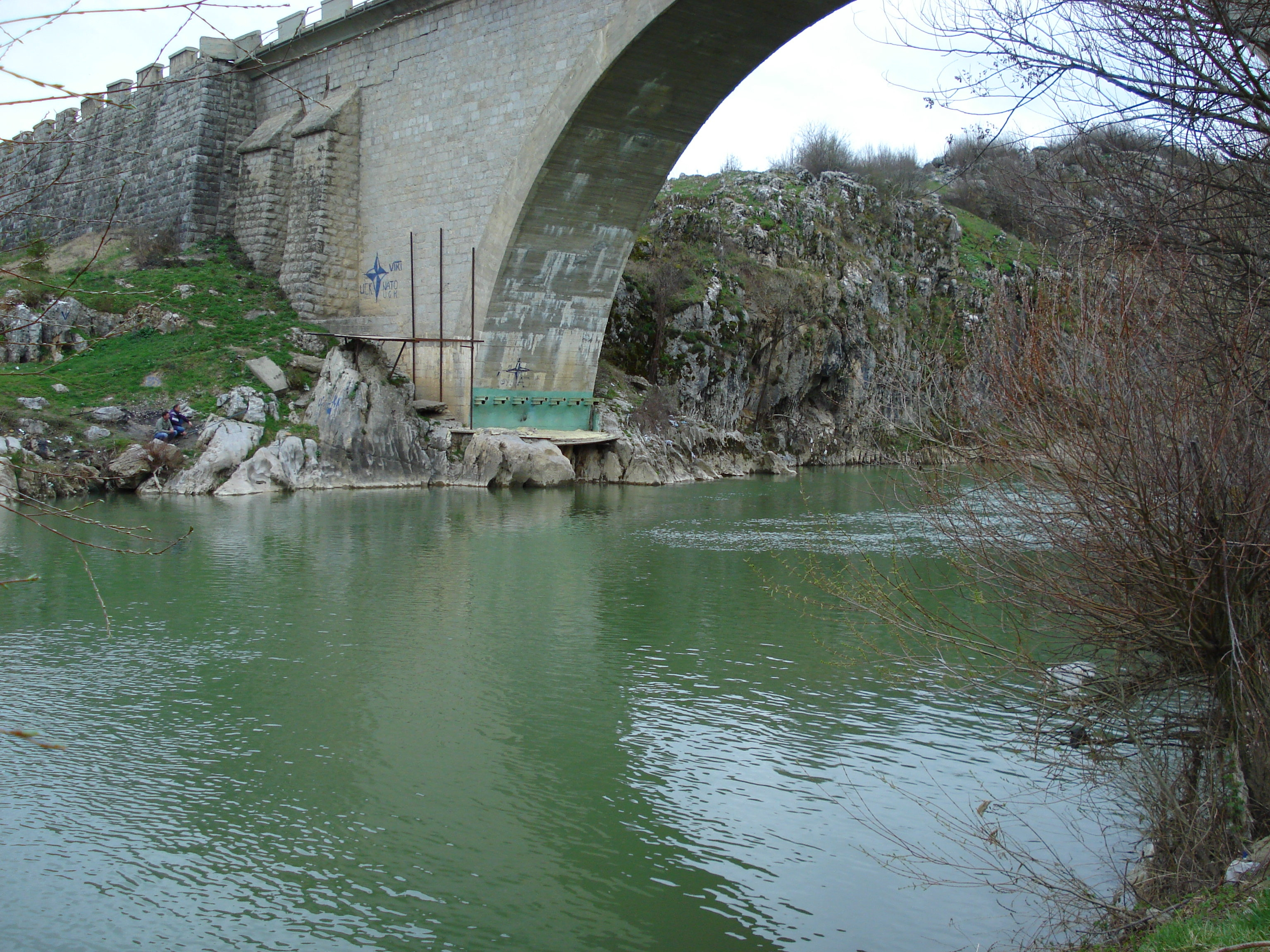
Fshajt Bridge

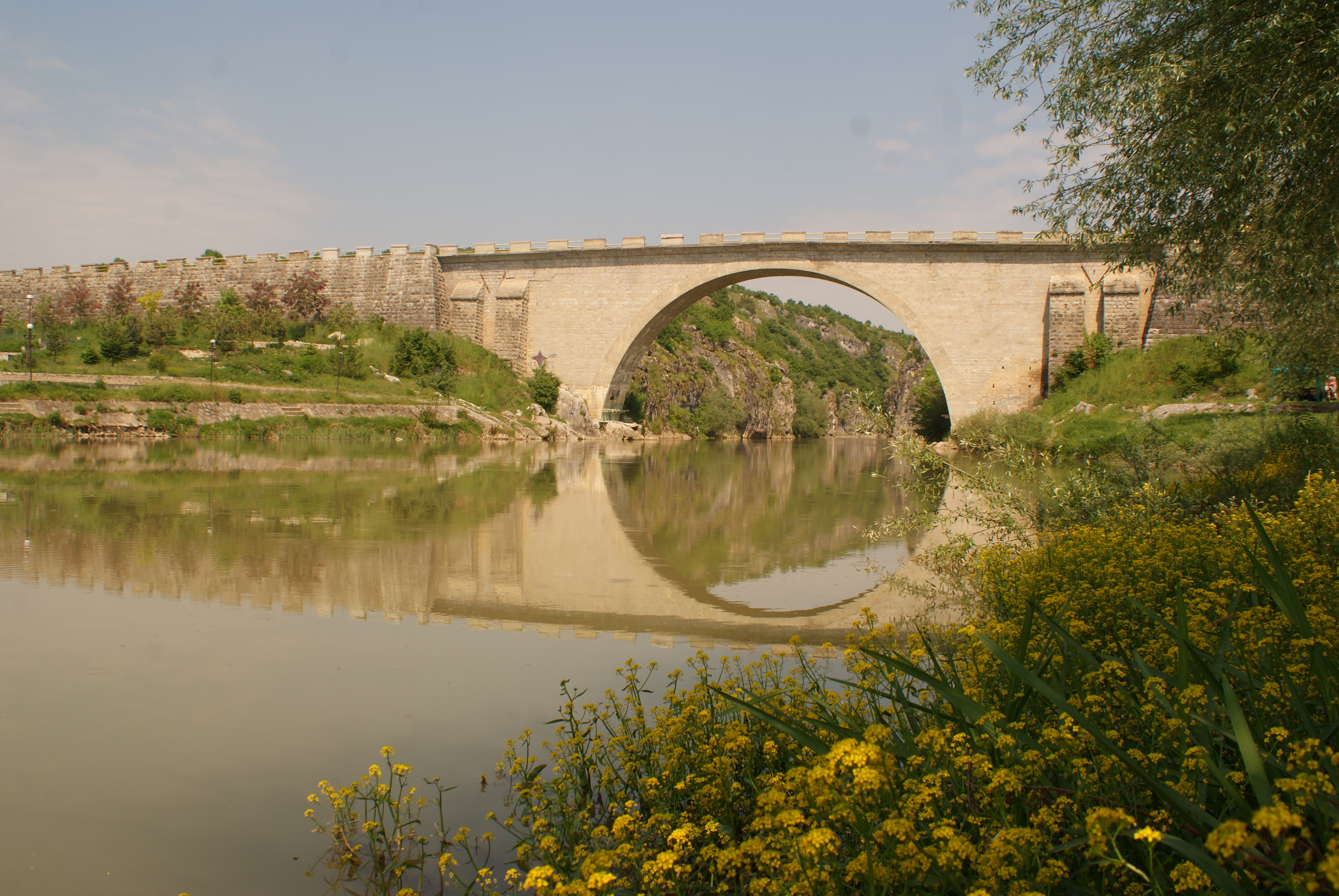
The bridge seen from south-eastern part

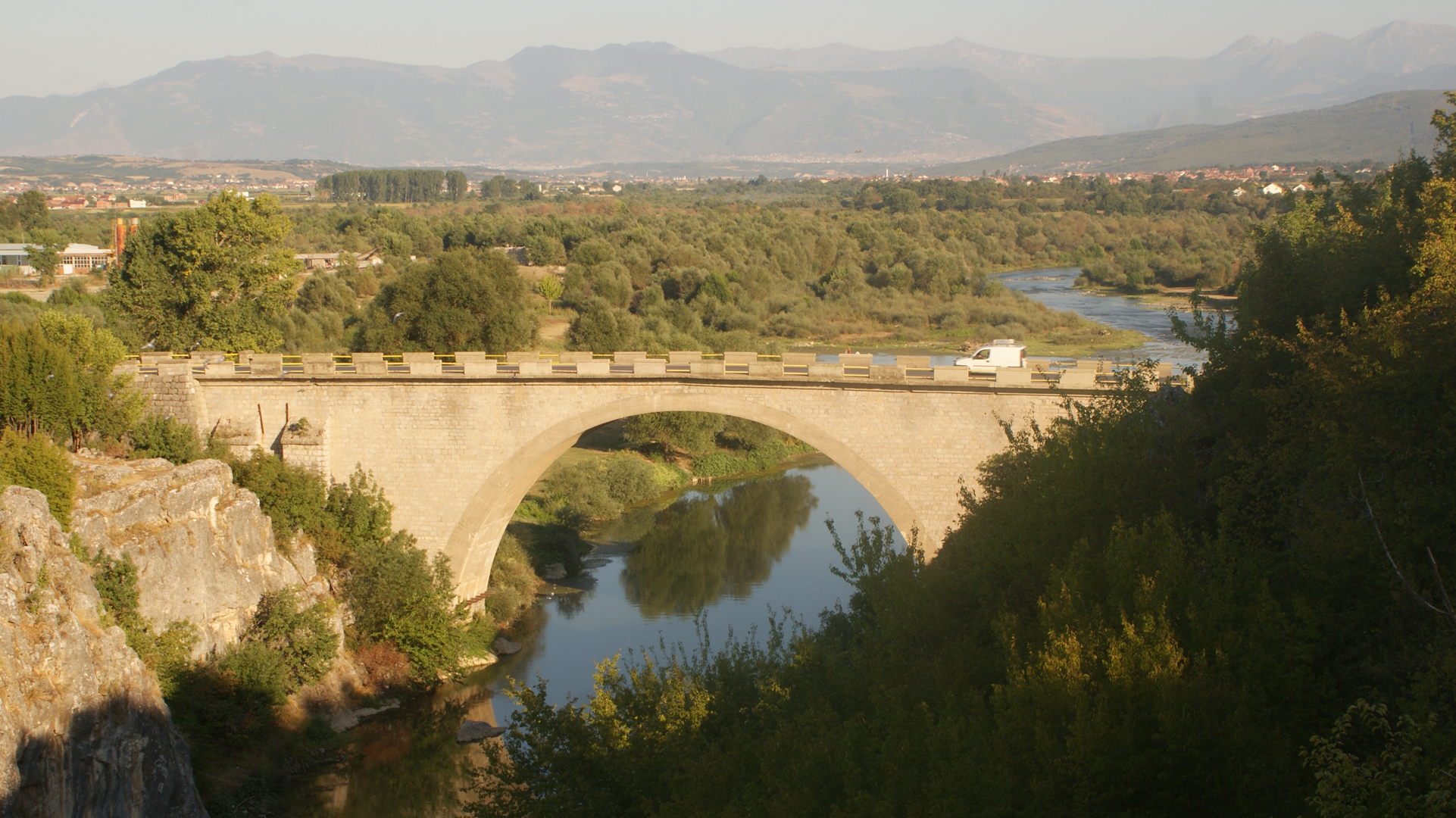
The bridge seen from the canyon in north-western part

== See also ==
- White Drin Canyon
- White Drin
