= White Drin =

River in Albania and Kosovo

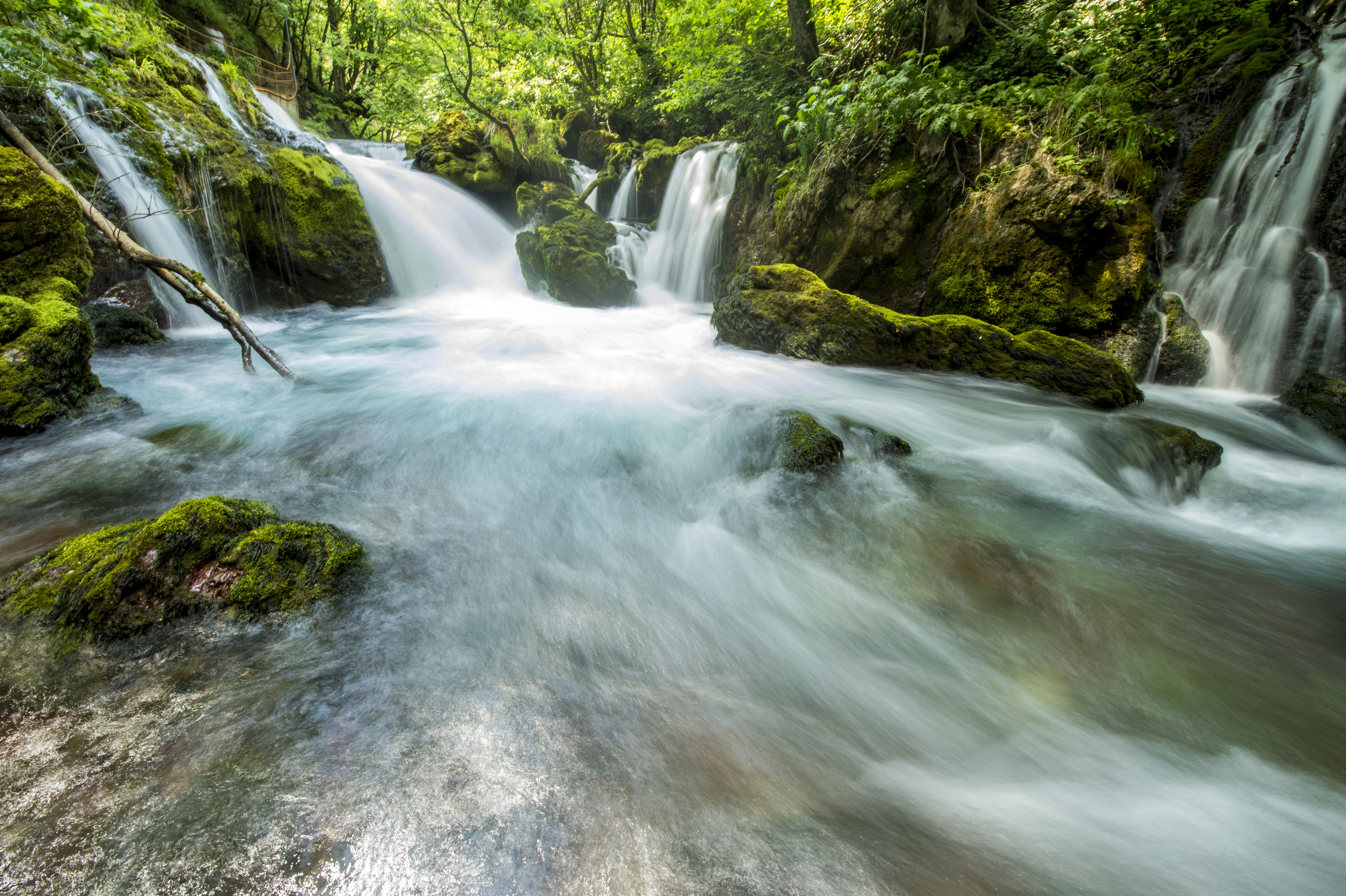
- Waterfall at the mouth of the White Drin River
- Native name: Drini i Bardhë (Albanian); Бели Дрим / Beli Drim (Serbian)

Location
- Countries: Kosovo; Albania

Physical characteristics
- Source
  - location: Zhleb mountain, north of Peja, Kosovo
- Mouth
  - location: with Black Drin forms the Drin, at Kukës, Albania
  - coordinates: 42°5′30″N 20°23′41″E
- Length: 136 km (85 mi)
- Basin size: 4,964 km^{2} (1,917 sq mi)
- Discharge
  - average: 66 m^{3}/s (2,300 cu ft/s)

Basin features
- Progression: Drin→ Adriatic Sea

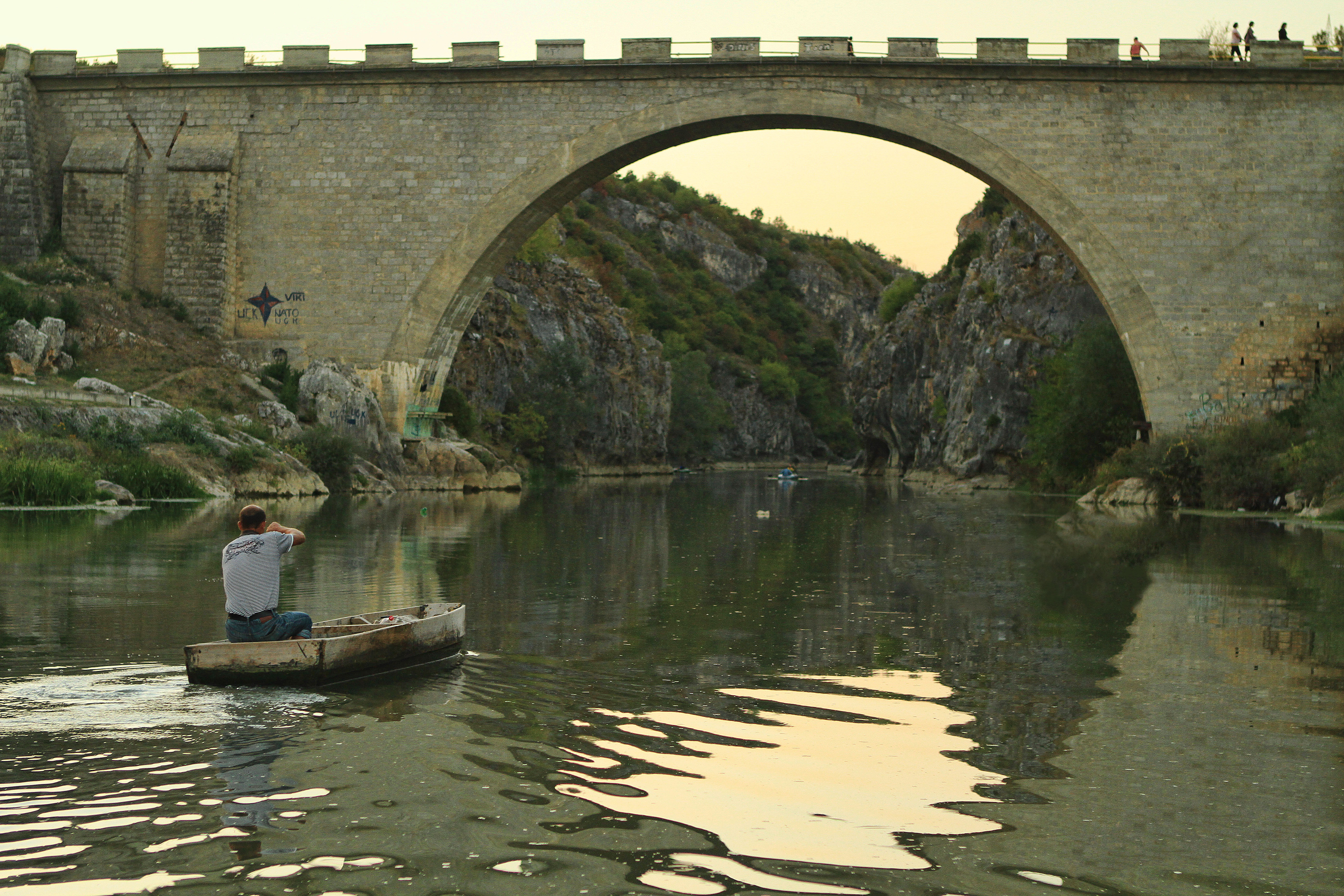
White Drin River and its canyon

The White Drin (Albanian: Drini i Bardhë, Serbian: Бели Дрим / Beli Drim), is a river in Kosovo and northern Albania, a ca. 140-kilometre (87 mi) long headstream of the Drin.

== Etymology ==
The name of the river is believed to be of Illyrian origin and was known in Ancient Greek as Drilon and in Latin as Drinus and developed into modern Drin through Albanian sound changes.

== Course ==
=== Kosovo ===
The Kosovo section of the White Drin flows entirely in the semi-karst part of Kosovo, in an arc-shaped 122-kilometre (76 mi)-long course. The river originates in the southern slopes of the Zhleb mountain, north of the town of Peja. The river springs near the Bukuroshja e Fjetur Cave. The cave is multi-levelled, not much explored and has a lake inside. The water from the spring was used by the Peja brewery. The stream is originally a sinking river which eventually springs out from the strong well and falls down as a 25-metre (82 ft)-high waterfall named the White Drin Waterfall near the village of Radac, 8 km (5.0 mi) away from Peja. In 1934, Russian émigré Dimitry Tyapkin projected and constructed a hydroelectric power plant next to the waterfalls which produced electricity for the town.

The White Drin first flows to the east, next to the spa of Banja of Peja or Ilixhe, and the villages of Banje, Novosellë, Dubova, Ozdrim, Trubuhoc and Zllakuqan, where it receives the Istog river from the left and turns to the south. The rest of the course is through the very fertile and densely populated central section of Kosovo (Podrima region), but oddly, there is not even one large settlement on the river itself, despite many smaller villages on the river. The largest cities are several miles away from the river (Peja, Gjakova, Prizren) whilst some smaller towns (Klina) and large villages (Krusha e Madhe, Gjonaj) are closer to it. The White Drin also creates the small White Drin Canyon in the Republic of Kosovo.

The White Drin receives many relatively long tributaries: Lumbardhi i Pejës, Lumbardhi i Deçanit, Prue Potok, and Erenik from the right; Istog, Klina, Mirusha, Rimnik, Topluga and Lumbardhi i Prizrenit from the left.

The Kosovo part of the White Drin basin comprises 4,360 km^{2} (1,680 sq mi). Here the waters of the river are used for waterworks of the big nearby towns, irrigation and power production (especially its right tributaries). At the Vërmica-Shalqin border crossing, the river enters the eastern Albanian region of Trektan.

==== Landmarks ====
- Roman Bridge ruins in Rogovë, Gjakova.

=== Albania ===
The Albanian section of the river is 16 km (9.9 mi) long with the drainage area of 604 km^{2} (233 sq mi). There are no settlements on the river and it receives the Lumë river from the left (which also originates in Kosovo, from several rivers in the region). Finally, the White Drin reaches the town of Kukës where it meets the Black Drin and forms the Drin, which flows into the Adriatic Sea; thus the White Drin belongs to the Adriatic Sea drainage basin. The river is not navigable.

The entire Albanian section (and part of the Kosovan) is flooded by the artificial Fierza lake (see Drin controversy).
