= Rogovë, Kosovo =

Rogovë: Rugovë (Albanian); Рогово/Rogovo (Serbian)
- Village
- Location within Kosovo
- Coordinates: 42.331209°N 20.580075°E
- Location: Kosovo
- District: Gjakovë
- Municipality: Gjakovë

Population (2024)
  - Total: 3,648
- Time zone: UTC+1 (Central European Time)
  - Summer (DST): UTC+2 (CEST)

Rogovë is one of the largest villages in the District of Gjakova, Kosovo. It is located alongside the White Drin river.

== Sports ==
Rogovë is home to the football club Pashtriku.

== Sights ==
- Roman Bridge
