= Roman Bridge (Gjakova) =

Cultural heritage monument of Kosovo

- Mbetjet e një ure romake në Rogovë (Albanian)
- Location: Rogovë, Gjakova, Kosovo

History
- Built: Roman Empire

The Roman Bridge is a cultural heritage monument in Rogovë, Gjakova, Kosovo.

Near a place known as Sacaranica on a bend of the White Drin River, traces of an old bridge remain. Soft clay soils here have kept the meander in its place. The three extant pieces of the bridge include two on the right bank and a foundation on the left bank. The foundation is made from large and medium stones bonded with lime mortar, while the walls are built from alternating stone strips and slabs similar to the brick-based opus mixtum found at other Roman ruins. Each 5 centimetres (2.0 in) to 6 centimetres (2.4 in) thick strip of heavily mortared large stones alternates with a set of three to four rows of limestone slabs the same thickness bound by fine mortar joints 1 centimetre (0.39 in) to 2 centimetres (0.79 in) long. Fine-gravel mortar is used in the slab joints, while coarse river gravel binds the stone belt joints.

River erosion resistance indicates a fairly strong mortar. The surviving wall is 1.8 metres (5.9 ft) thick. Both wall sections include square holes for wooden beams 15 centimetres (5.9 in) by 18 centimetres (7.1 in). Over time, rotting beams and trees pierced holes on one side of the wall. Only 3 kilometres (1.9 mi) to 4 kilometres (2.5 mi) from the Gexha castrum, the bridge likely was associated with such a fort on a Roman road along the White Drin, supported by such evidence as old residential fort ruins and ceramic remains found by villagers in nearby Plehnishta and Deliçina.
