= Korçë Airfield =

- IATA: none; ICAO: LAKO

Summary
- Airport type: Public
- Owner: Albanian Army
- Operator: Government
- Location: Lumalas, Korçë, Albania
- Elevation AMSL: 665 ft / 203 m
- Coordinates: 40°38′55.8″N 20°44′26.4″E
- Interactive map of Korçë Airfield

Runways
Direction	Length		Surface
Direction	m	ft	Surface
01/19	2,278	7,475	Grass/Earth

Korçë Airfield (ICAO: LAKO) was an aerodrome serving Korçë, a city in southeastern Albania. As of 2022, it is reported as being closed.

== See also ==
- List of airports in Albania
