= Low-cost carrier terminal =

Type of airport terminal

A low-cost carrier terminal or LCCT (also known as a budget terminal) is a specific type of airport terminal designed with the needs of low-cost airlines in mind. Though terminals may have differing charges and costs, as is common in Europe, the concept of an all-budget terminal was promoted and pioneered by Tony Fernandes of AirAsia at Kuala Lumpur International Airport in 2006.

== Description ==
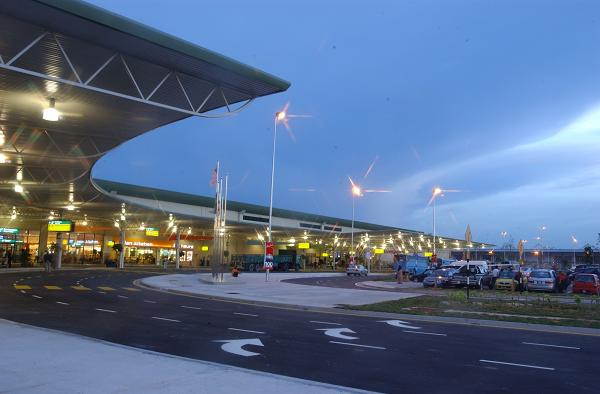
The former Kuala Lumpur International Airport Low-cost carrier terminal (above) and its interior (below). It was replaced by KLIA2 in May 2014.

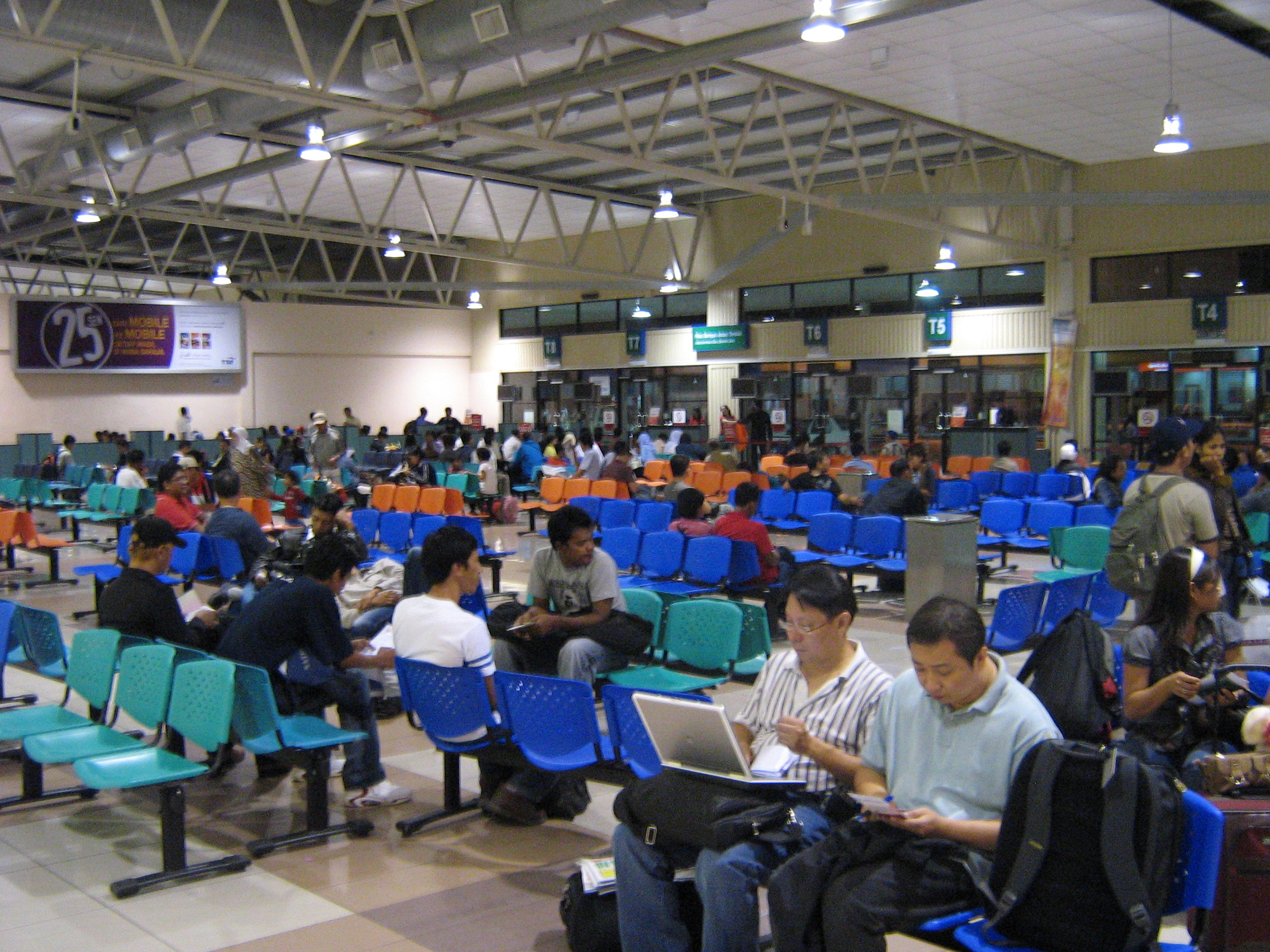

In some cases, the designs of a low-cost carrier terminal mimic old designs of an airport terminal, such as the former airport of Hong Kong, Kai Tak Airport. With a stripped-down airport terminal, airports can reduce daily operating costs significantly, thereby passing along the savings to budget airlines and ultimately their passengers. It specifically entails cost reductions from normal airports in terms of:

- Physical building:
  - forgoing expensive architectural design for simple boxy warehouse-like design.
  - low ceilings.
  - foregoing steel and glass structures to reduce air conditioning overhead cost.
- Amenities:
  - may have less choice in terms of restaurants and duty-free shops.
  - decoration may be mostly airline ads.
- Support structures:
  - long corridors, moving walkways, and jet bridges often replaced by transport with airport buses and boarding with airstairs. (This also allows quicker plane turnaround time, which may lower landing fees, and increase aircraft utilization).
  - Baggage handling is much simplified, e.g. some LCCTs lack baggage carousels.

However these terminals may also have modern facilities such as free Wi-Fi, and be comfortably air conditioned. A German study (Swanson 2007) of costs showed that at Malaysia's KLIA and Changi LCCTs, airlines were charged roughly 2/3 to 3/4 the total cost of landing at the main terminal; for budget-sensitive carriers, any savings advantage can be critical.

Klia2 billed as the world's largest purpose-built terminal dedicated to low-cost carriers, is designed to cater for 45 million passengers a year with future capacity expansion capability. Built at a cost of US$1.3 billion, klia2 started commercial operations on May 2, 2014, at the Kuala Lumpur International Airport in Malaysia.

== Realisation of the projects ==
While the concept of a simple basic terminal in theory would lower costs, in practice, it can be turned into a pork barrel project such as klia2.

When klia2 was first proposed MAHB said it would cost MYR2 billion, a figure that was later revised to MYR2.6 billion. Then came news that the terminal would cost MYR4 billion, double the original estimate. Now there’s talk that the bill could go as high as MYR5 billion. That makes no sense – the low-cost terminal will now cost much more than KLIA. Yes, I asked for a new terminal but one that has simple facilities. Did it have to cost 20 times our present LCCT?

— Tony Fernandes, on klia2.

Budget terminals also have to consider if they only serve budget airlines or all airlines. In this way, a terminal can essentially "lose its budget identity". In the case of Macau airport, "from an airport perspective, having a separate LCCT is frequently more expensive than having one terminal for all carrier types because of the need to duplicate services and systems including check-in, security and immigration." In the case of KLIA2, Malaysia Airports has instructed Airasia in 2016 that the overbudget terminal isn't a LCCT terminal at all.

== List of existing/expanding budget terminals ==
=== Europe ===
- (Albania) Kukës International Airport Zayed - Airport dedicated to low-cost carriers.
- (Belgium) Brussels South Charleroi Airport - Their flights are mainly from low-cost carriers.
- (Denmark) Copenhagen Airport - The F pier, formerly called CPH Go, is dedicated to low-cost airlines.
- (France) Lyon–Saint-Exupéry Airport - The creation of Terminal 3, a former charter facility for low-cost airlines.
- Marseille Provence Airport - First terminal entirely developed for low-cost airlines in France.
- (France) Toulouse–Blagnac Airport - The new Hall A dedicated for low-cost and regional airlines.
- (Georgia (country)) David the Builder Kutaisi International Airport - Airport served mainly by low-cost carriers.
- (Germany) Berlin Brandenburg Airport - It has a dedicated low-cost terminal, known as Terminal 2. The old Berlin Schönefeld Airport was also incorporated into this Airport as Terminal 5, temporarily housing low-cost airlines until Terminal 2 was built, and closing in 2022.
- (Germany) Cologne Bonn Airport - It is served mainly by Ryanair and Eurowings, the larger Düsseldorf Airport is the main airport of Rhine-Ruhr.
- (Germany) Frankfurt–Hahn Airport - The only airlines that operate commercial passenger service to/from the airport of which are low-cost carriers.
- (Germany) Weeze Airport - Sometimes referred to as Dusseldorf Weeze Airport (even though it is about 90 kilometers from Dusseldorf), this former military airport has been converted into a civilian airport. The terminal was built cheap with the aircraft being parked on the apron next to it. All airlines using this airport are low-cost airlines.
- (Hungary) Budapest Ferenc Liszt International Airport - When it opened in 2020 all low-cost airlines moved to pier 1.
- (Republic of Ireland) Dublin Airport - It serves as the headquarters of Ireland's flag carrier – Aer Lingus, Europe's largest low-cost carrier – Ryanair, and ASL Airlines Ireland, together with another airline, CityJet.
- (Italy) Milan Malpensa Airport - Terminal 2 is exclusively dedicated to low-cost carriers (mostly EasyJet).
- (Italy) Leonardo da Vinci–Fiumicino Airport - Terminal 2 is exclusively dedicated to low-cost carriers.
- (Italy) Treviso Airport - Low-cost alternative to Venice Marco Polo Airport.
- (Latvia) Riga International Airport - Largest airport in the Baltic states with direct flights, and as one of the base airports of low-cost airlines.
- (Netherlands) Amsterdam Airport Schiphol - Has a dedicated pier for low-cost operations that incorporates some details of the LCCT concept. This pier is designated with letters H (non-Schengen flights) and M (Schengen flights).
- (Poland) Warsaw Modlin Airport - Airport dedicated to low-cost carriers.
- (Portugal) Lisbon Airport - Terminal 2 accommodates all low-cost airlines.
- (Romania) Aurel Vlaicu International Airport - Was Bucharest's low-cost hub for several years, until airlines were forced to move into Henri Coanda Airport, and Aurel Vlaicu Airport was turned into an executive "city" airport. In 2023, Aurel Vlaicu reopened to airlines.
- (Spain) Josep Tarradellas Barcelona–El Prat Airport - When Terminal 1 was opened, Terminals A, B and C -with some areas closed- were integrated into Terminal 2, that now houses low-cost operations, except for Level-Vueling, that operates from Terminal 1.
- (Sweden) Stockholm Skavsta Airport - A former military airport, now an airport dedicated to low-cost carriers.
- (United Kingdom) Gatwick Airport - The world's leading low-cost airport.
- (United Kingdom) London Stansted Airport - Stansted is a base for a number of major European low-cost carriers, being the largest base for low-cost airline Ryanair.
- (United Kingdom) Luton Airport - The airport serves as a base for EasyJet, TUI Airways, Ryanair and Wizz Air.
- (Ukraine) Boryspil International Airport - Opened in March 2019, Terminal F, a former cargo terminal as the terminal for low-cost carriers.
- (Russia) Zhukovsky International Airport - Its only terminal incorporates some of the ideas of the LCCT concept, thus developing the old Ramenskoye airport into Moscow's low-cost hub.

=== Asia & Oceania ===
- (Australia) Avalon Airport - Melbourne's second-largest airport was built as a low-cost airport, all airlines flying here are low-cost airlines.
- Melbourne Airport - the first budget terminal in Australia, Terminal 4 is currently used by Jetstar.
- (India) Indira Gandhi International Airport - Terminal 1 not dedicated to but being used by low-cost carriers
- (Indonesia) Soekarno–Hatta International Airport Terminal 1C & 2F - Terminal 1C is domestic LCCT when 2F is the international LCCT. created by elimination of existing air conditioning, duty-free shops, baggage handling and air bridges, reducing # of check-in desks, while adding kiosks, self-service bag drop, and expanding the capacity from 9 to 24 million.
- (Japan) Chubu Centrair International Airport - small budget terminal opened on September 20, 2019.
- (Japan) Naha Airport - small budget terminal opened Oct 2012.
- (Japan) Narita International Airport Terminal 3 opened April 8, 2015 with discounted airport tax.
- (Japan) Kansai International Airport - small budget terminal opened Oct 2012.
- (Malaysia) Kuala Lumpur International Airport - klia2, Opened in May 2014 and it is a hybrid terminal that accommodates low-cost carriers.
- (Malaysia) Kota Kinabalu International Airport - Not a true LCCT terminal as non-budget carriers use this terminal, but incorporates the concept.
- (Thailand) Don Mueang International Airport - Former main airport of Bangkok before being replaced by Suvarnabhumi International Airport.

=== North & South America ===
- (Argentina) El Palomar Airport - Military airport, where a low-cost terminal was built, but closed due to the Covid pandemic.
- (Brazil) São Paulo–Congonhas Airport - Created as a cargo terminal, Terminal 1 nowadays is used by 2 Brazilian LCCT without jetbridges and a simple departure lounge with 9 gates
- (Colombia) Guaymaral Airport - Military airport, now shares the airport with low-cost carriers.
- (Colombia) Olaya Herrera Airport - Past Medellín’s main airport terminal, now a low-cost terminal and second most busiest airport in Medellín.
- (Panama) Panamá Pacífico International Airport - Ex military airport located in the old Howard Air Force Base, now transformed for low-cost airlines to operate.
- (United States) Austin–Bergstrom International Airport - the South Terminal hosted Austin's ULCCs until its closure in March 2026.

== List of proposed budget terminals ==
- (Taiwan) Taoyuan International Airport
- (Philippines) Clark International Airport, the first in the country, despite having low-cost carriers for decades.
- (Thailand) Bangkok is also urged by airlines to consider such a terminal
- (Australia) Brisbane is considering a LCCT under its master plan.
- Transportation Secretary of Philippines unveiled a plan for a LCCT at NAIA.
- China is actively looking into LCCTs as well as low cost carriers.
