= Shefqet Kastrati =

Albanian entrepreneur (born 1961)

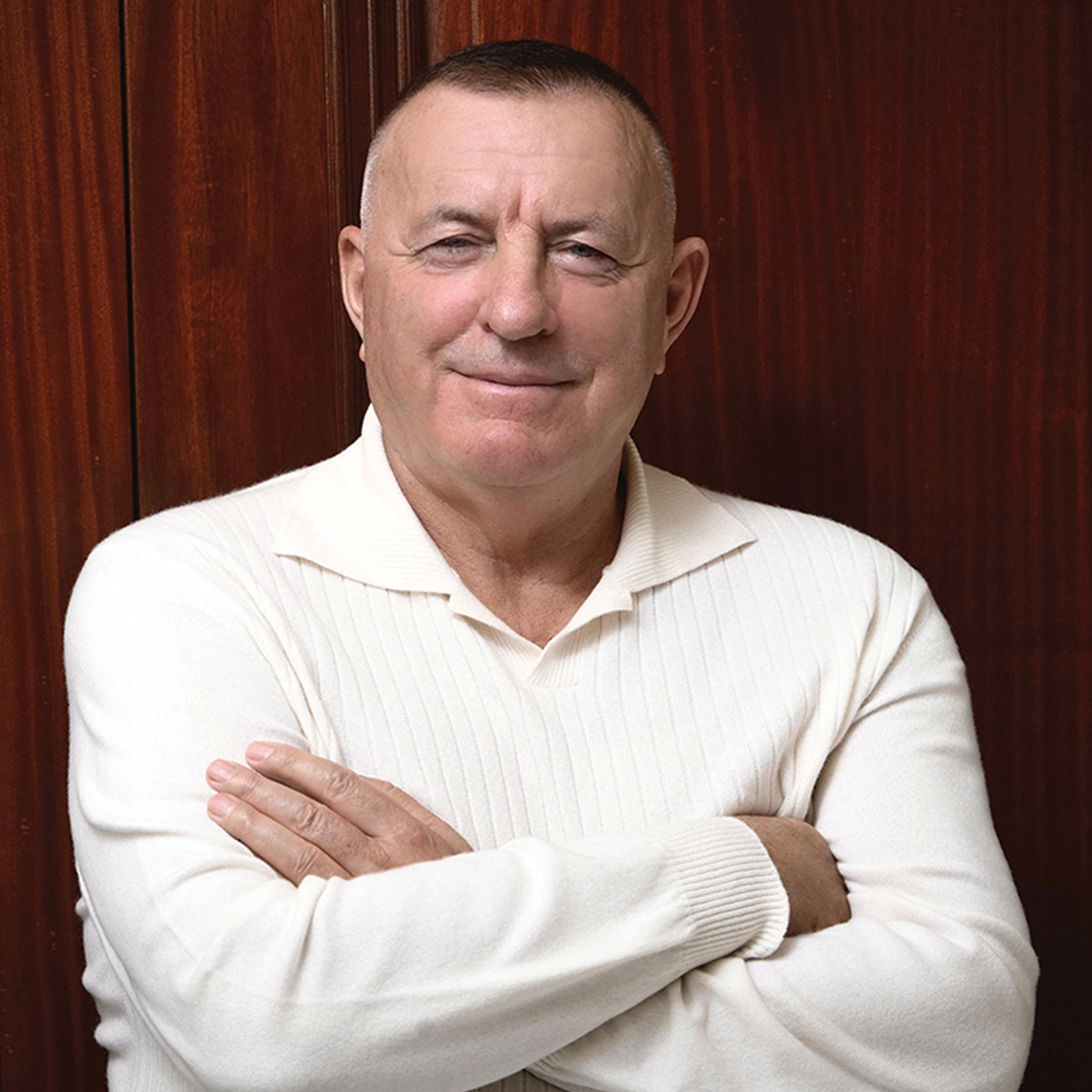
- Kastrati in 2024
- Born: June 5, 1961 (age 65); Hasi, PR Albania
- Occupations: Businessman, entrepreneur
- Known for: Founder and President of business conglomerate Kastrati Group

Shefqet Kastrati (born June 5, 1961) is an Albanian entrepreneur and the founder of Kastrati Group, an Albanian privately owned business conglomerate.
