= Kukës International Airport Zayed =

International airport in Albania

Kukës International Airport Zayed Aeroporti Ndërkombëtar i Kukësit Zayed

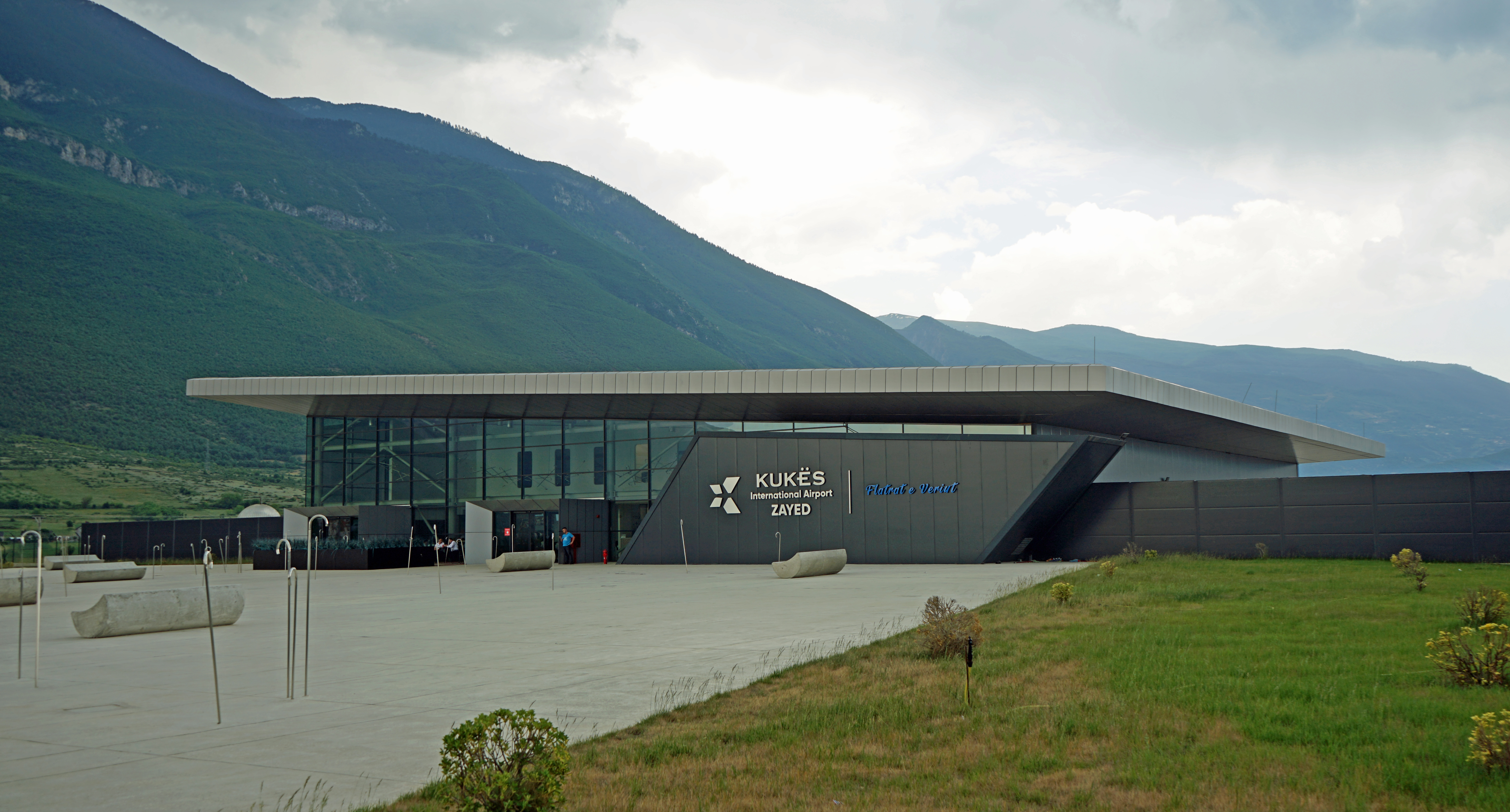
- IATA: KFZ; ICAO: LAKU

Summary
- Airport type: Public
- Owner/Operator: Global Technical Mechanics SHPK via Kukës International Airport SHPK
- Serves: Kukës, Kukës County, Albania
- Location: Shtiqën, Kukës County, Albania
- Opened: 9 July 2021 (5 years ago)
- Built: 1999; 27 years ago (current form)
- Elevation AMSL: 1,120 ft (340 m)
- Coordinates: 42°1′58.2″N 20°24′53.8″E
- Website: www.kuiport.al

Map
- Location in Albania Location in the Mediterranean Location in Europe

Runways
Direction	Length		Surface
Direction	m	ft	Surface
01/19	2,198	7,211	Asphalt

Kukës International Airport Zayed (Albanian: Aeroporti Ndërkombëtar i Kukësit Zayed, IATA: KFZ, ICAO: LAKU), is an international airport located in Kukës, Albania. The airport is located 3.5 km (2.2 mi) south of the city of Kukës. The main purpose of Kukës International Airport is to serve as an alternative airport to Tirana International Airport Nënë Tereza.

The airport was built with United Arab Emirates investments made at the time of Sheikh Zayed bin Sultan Al Nahyan and, to honor these investments, the airport bears the name of Sheikh Zayed. It is designed to serve as a low-cost airport.

== History ==
=== Beginnings as domestic airfield ===
Kukës International Airport is located 3.5 km (2.2 mi) south of the city of Kukës, in the village Shtiqën. The beginnings of Kukës International Airport date back to 1929 when on 20 April it opened for the first time as a domestic airfield offering an air connection between Tirana and Kukës via Peshkopi. The air link was operational for 15 years until the communist regime did not see fit to allow it to function as a civil airfield and turned it into a military airfield.

=== Reactivation and transformation ===
During the Kosovo War, the United Arab Emirates organized a modern camp in Kukës to help Kosovo War refugees. First, they developed an airfield for the supply of incoming aid to Kukës. At that time, the United Arab Emirates representatives presented the idea for the development of the civil airport as a gift to the area, which faced the largest influx of citizens of Kosovo. After accepting this idea, the Kukës Airport project was further developed with joint studies of the General Directorate of Civil Aviation and investors. Based on the decision of the Council of Ministers of 15 February 2001, a Memorandum of Understanding was approved between the Government of the Republic of Albania and the Government of the United Arab Emirates for the construction of Kukës Airport.

Construction of the airport began on 10 May 2003 and was completed on 31 October 2005 and was expected to employ more than 200 people, helping the local economy by opening more touristic opportunities for the region. The total investment amount was approximately $20 million, a funding gift from the government of the United Arab Emirates. On 7 June 2006, Kukës Airport came under the administration of the General Directorate of Civil Aviation, which, after 2010, was renamed the Civil Aviation Authority.

In 2021, the name was changed to Kukës International Airport Zayed (Albanian: Aeroporti Ndërkombëtar i Kukësit Zayed) by Prime Minister Edi Rama, in honor of Sheikh Zayed bin Sultan Al Nahyan who sponsored the investment.

The opening ceremony of Kukës International Airport took place on 18 April 2021. To commemorate the occasion, Air Albania Flight 9003 arrived from London Stansted Airport after making a short stopover at Tirana International Airport Nënë Tereza, as the airport had not been approved for international flights at the time. On 9 July 2021, the first ever international commercial flight landed at Kukës Airport when Helvetic Airways Flight 8174 arrived from Zurich Airport.

== Facilities ==
The airport can accommodate small to medium-sized aircraft. The apron offers parking spots for up to three aircraft and the terminal is equipped to handle up to 500,000 passengers annually.

=== Operational challenges ===
The airport has faced difficulties in attracting and securing airline operators, which has affected its full operationalization. One of the technical challenges noted involves the landing corridor, which presents specific conditions that may impact the regularity of flight operations. On 30 December 2024, a new airline named Air Kosova was established with the aim of maintaining regular flight operations to and from the airport. The initiative was referred to by Prime Minister Edi Rama as a shared source of national pride, alongside Air Albania.

== Airlines and destinations ==
As of 4 June 2024, there are no regular passenger flights to/from Kukës Airport.

== Statistics ==
Year	Passengers	Change	Aircraft movements	Change
2021	4,742	Steady	85	Steady
2022	39,752	▲738.3%	545	▲541%
2023	22,554	▼43.3%	N/A	N/A

== See also ==
- List of airports in Albania
  - Tirana International Airport Nënë Tereza
  - Vlora International Airport

== Notes and references ==
=== Notes ===
1. The beginnings of Kukës International Airport date back to 20 April 1929 when it opened for the first time as a domestic airfield offering air connection between Tirana and Kukës via Peshkopi. The service was operational for 15 years until the communist regime did not see fit to allow it to function as a civil airfield and turned it into a military airfield. then after the fall of the communist regime there were attempts to reopen as international airport it but without success until 2021, when on 18 April the opening ceremony took place, and on 9 July the first-ever international commercial flight took place and this date is officially considered as the opening date of this airport.
