= Shkodër Airfield =

- IATA: none; ICAO: LASK

Summary
- Location: Shtoj, Rrethinat, Albania
- Elevation AMSL: 144 ft (44 m)
- Coordinates: 42°5′21.7″N 19°39′32.8″E
- Interactive map of Shkodër Airfield

Runways
Direction	Length		Surface
Direction	m	ft	Surface
01/19	424	1,391	Grass/Earth

Shkodër Airfield (ICAO: LASK) was an aerodrome serving Shkodër, a city in northern Albania. As of 2026, it is reported as being closed.

== History ==
Constructed during the Italian Occupation of Albania, the airfield was built and used by German forces in 1943-1944. After the war ended, repairs were completed, and work had begun toward modernizing thanks to the help of Soviet specialists. Although it did not have a paved runway and the modernization work was never completed, in the 1950s the airfield looked like a modern airport, with Soviet transports in use and supplied by air.

In a CIA-declassified document from November 21st 1950, the Shkodër airfield is described as relatively large, with a drainage system and a hangar but no concrete runway. The document states that the landing directions were indicated by red lights. According to a similar document dated 1950, the Shkoder airfield had excellent road connections to both Yugoslavia (via Podgorica) and central Albania. The report also noted that a railway line planned to pass near the airfield was under construction.

== See also ==
- List of airports in Albania
