= Kodër-Lumë =

- Village
- Location within Albania
- Coordinates: 42°04′N 20°27′E
- Country: Albania
- County: Kukës
- Municipality: Kukës
- Administrative unit: Shtiqën
- Time zone: UTC+1 (CET)
  - Summer (DST): UTC+2 (CEST)
- Postal Code: 8513

Kodër-Lumë (also called Lumë) is a village in the former Shtiqën municipality, Kukës County, Albania. At the 2015 local government reform it became part of the municipality Kukës.

It is part of the Lumë region. According to Johann Georg von Hahn, both the village and the region take the name from the Lumë stream.
