= White Drin Canyon =

Canyon in southwestern Kosovo

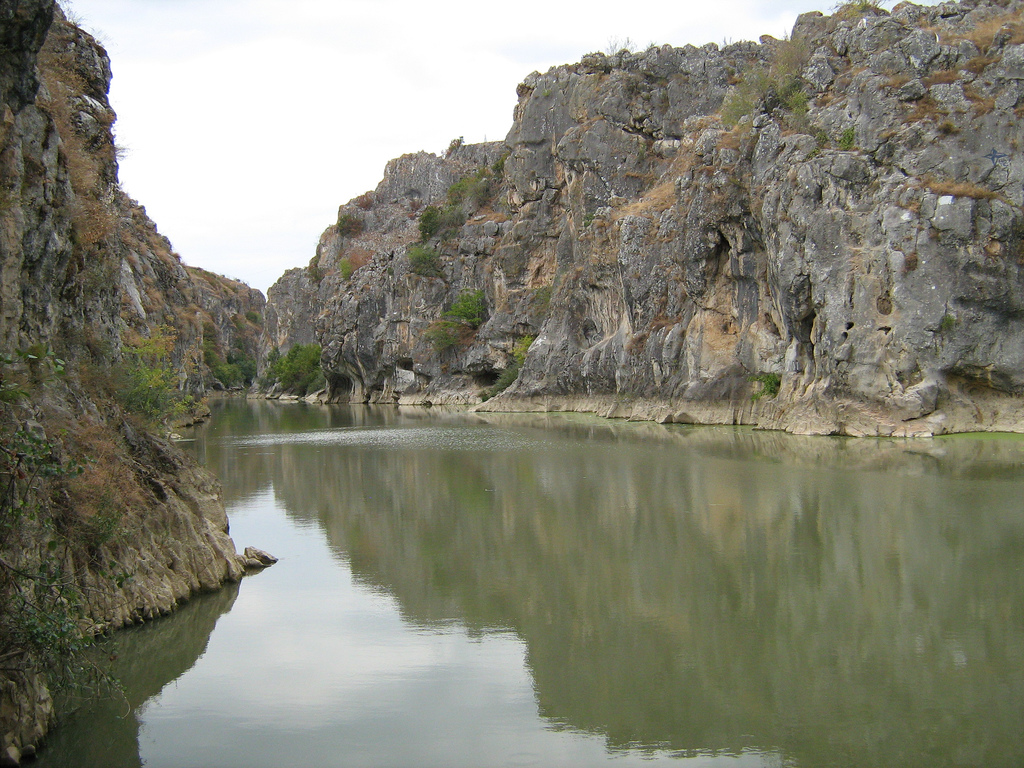
- White Drin Canyon
- Interactive map of White Drin Canyon
- Location: Kosovo
- Nearest city: Gjakova
- Coordinates: 42.352944°N 20.540639°E
- Area: 199 ha (490 acres)
- Established: 1986

The White Drin Canyon or White Drin Gorge (Albanian: Gryka e Drinit të Bardhë; Serbian: Kanjon Belog Drima, Кањон Белог Дрима) is a small canyon located in the southwestern Kosovo. The White Drin river runs through the canyon. The canyon is relatively short, only being about 900 m (1 mi) long with a depth of 45 meters. At the entrance of the canyon is Fshajt Bridge, an old Ottoman bridge which attracts divers from all over the Balkans. Canyon of the White Drin river at Fshajt Bridge due to its hydrological and geomorphological values, in 1986 was taken under legal protection as a Natural Monument.

== Geography ==
White Drin Canyon is located next to Fshajt Bridge near the village of Xërxë (Rahovec municipality) in Gjakova - Prizren road. The canyon is a morpho-hydro phenomena with genetic, visual and educational value. It was formed during the post-lacustric period of the Dukagjini neogene lake. Its formation was conditioned by many tectonic events. The gorge has typical canyon features and contains many carbonate formations.

== Tourism ==
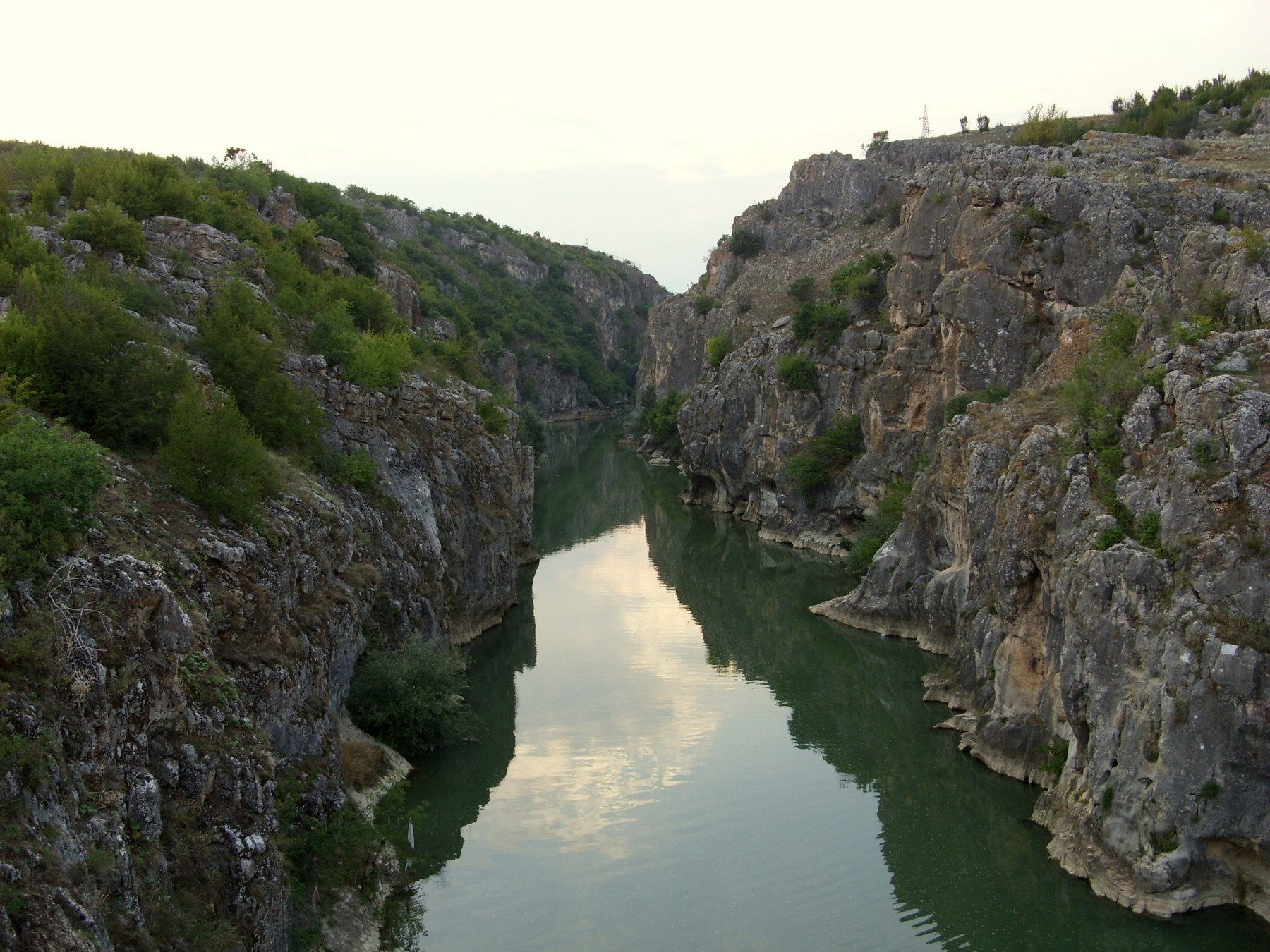
The canyon seen from the Fshajt Bridge

During a long geo-morphological process the White Drin River opened a canyon between two calcareous rocks, by creating a very attractive and interesting canyon for researchers and visitors. Located next to the main road that connects Gjakova and Prizren, the White Drin Canyon is visited by high number of foreign tourists as well as locals. The one arch Fshajt Bridge over the canyon represents another important touristic attraction in the area. A competition “the jumping from the bridge” is held every year which is attended by many regional competitors. Both, the bridge and the canyon are legally protected since 1986. The protected area surface is 199 ha and it belongs to the municipalities Rahovec (124.96 ha) and Gjakova (73.86).

Close to the bridge there are two rocks known as "Eagle Rock" (Shkëmbi i Shqiponjës) and "Skanderbeg Rock" (Shkëmbi i Skenderbeut), which features an engraving of 15th-century Albanian nobleman George Kastrioti Skanderbeg. The portrait of Skanderbeg was painted in the rock in 1968 by Mexhid Yvejsi on the occasion of the 500th anniversary of his death.

At the upper end of the canyon you can find a pleasant restaurant where you can eat freshly caught fish from the White Drin River.

== Gallery ==
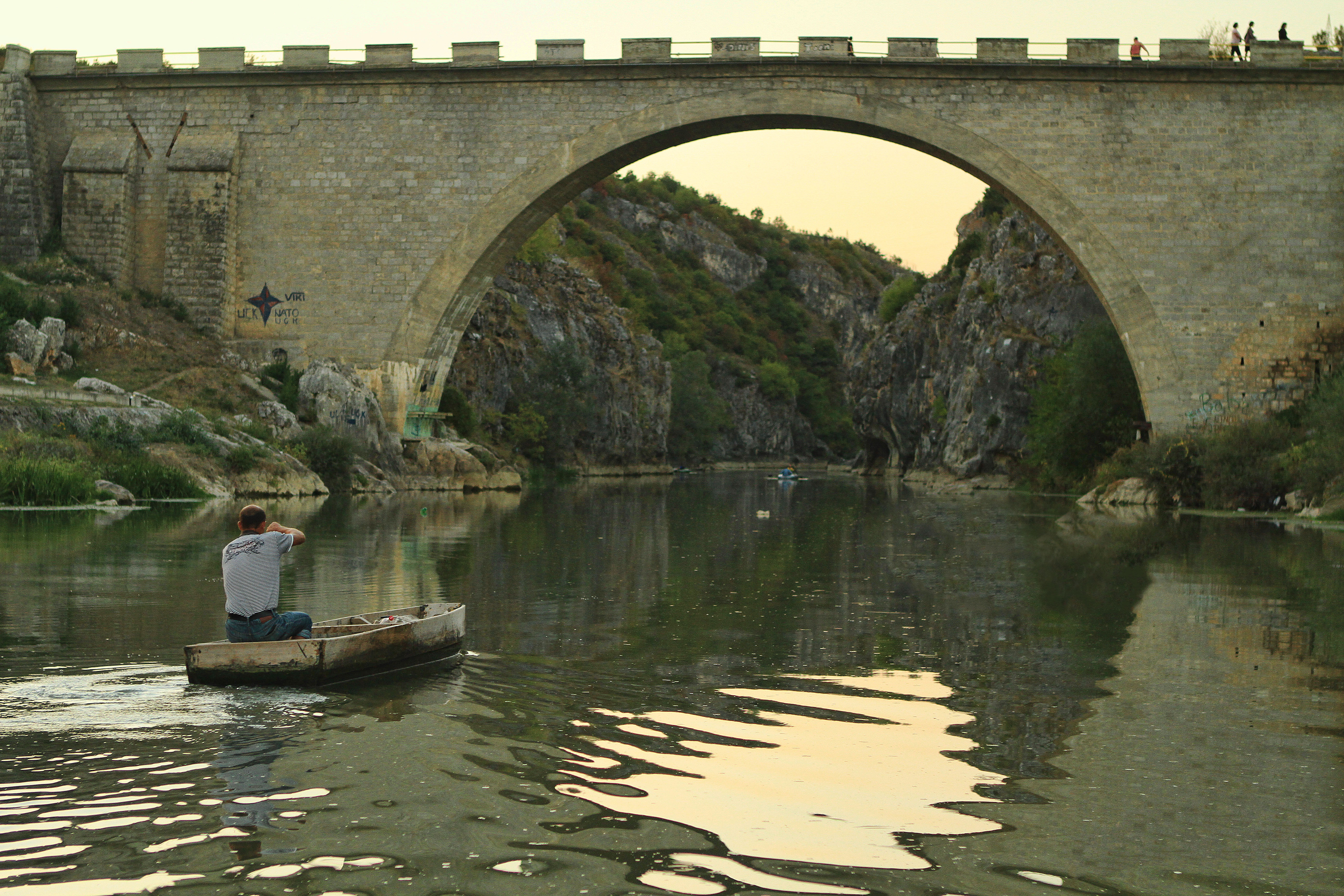
A boat at the mouth of the Fshajt Bridge and the canyon

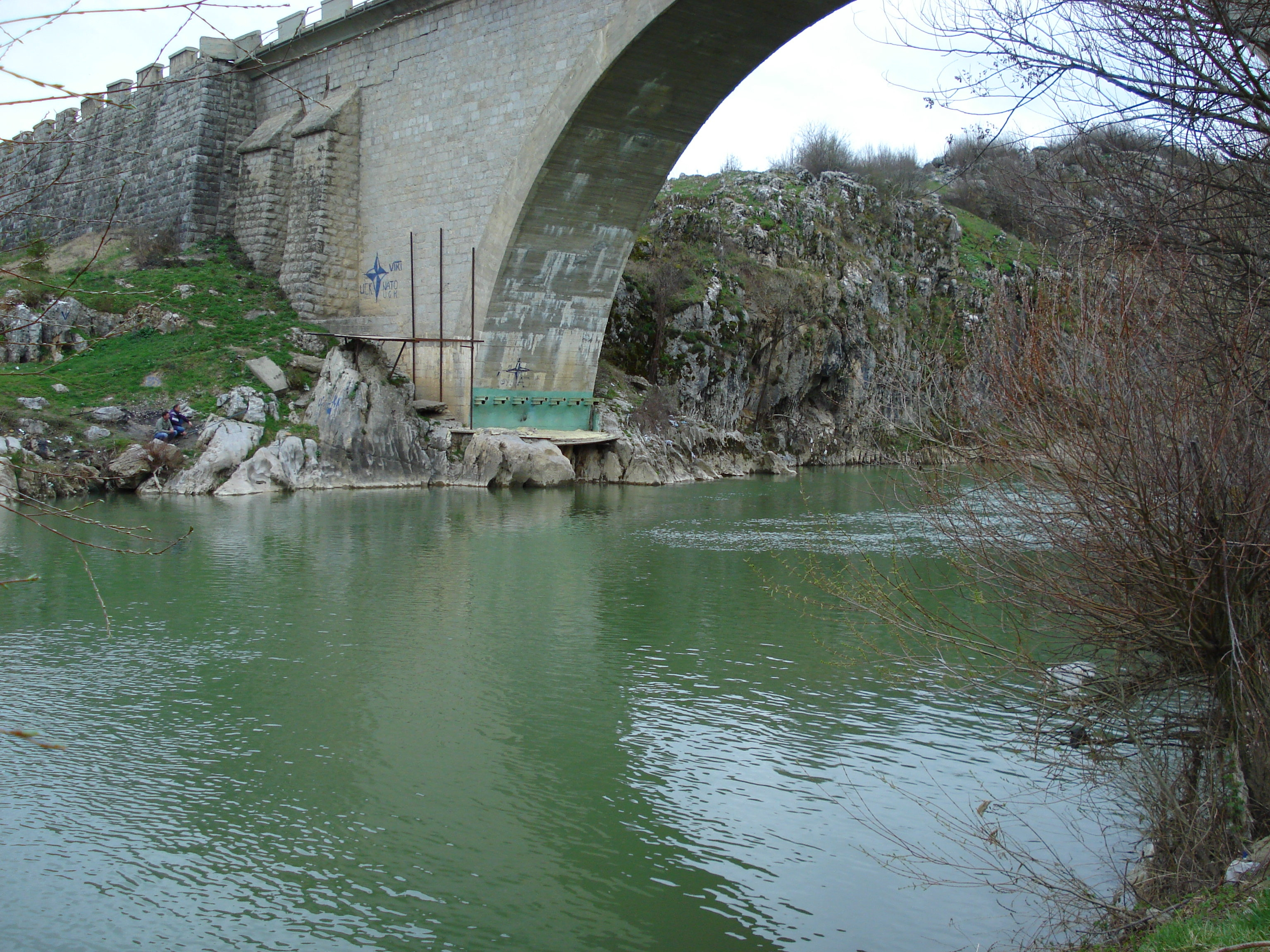
Fshajt Bridge

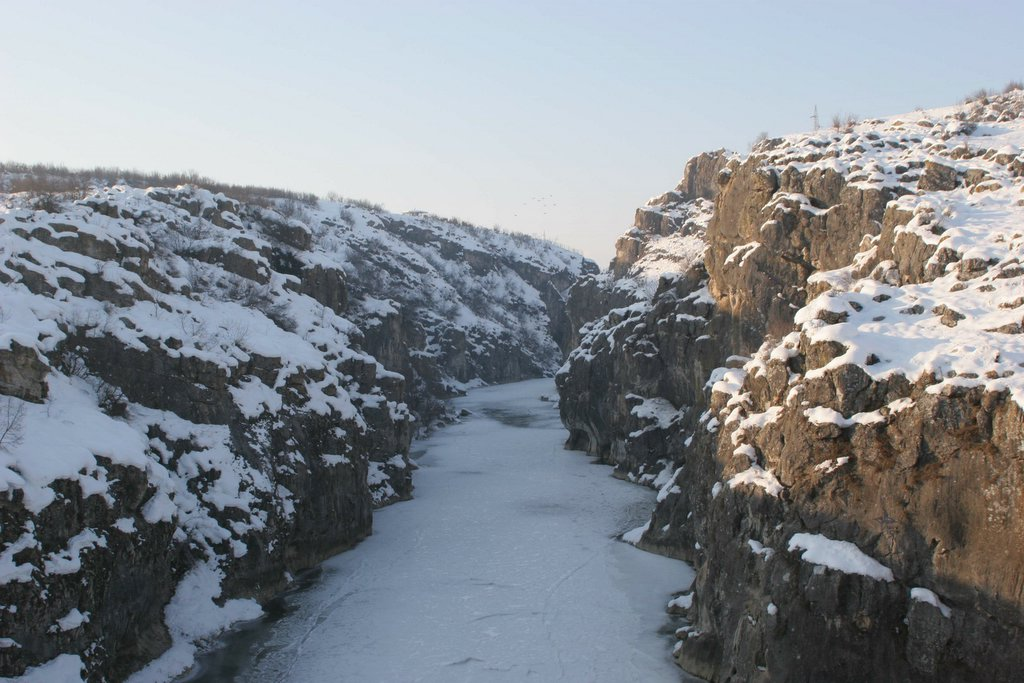
Frozen Drin River and the canyon seen from the bridge in January

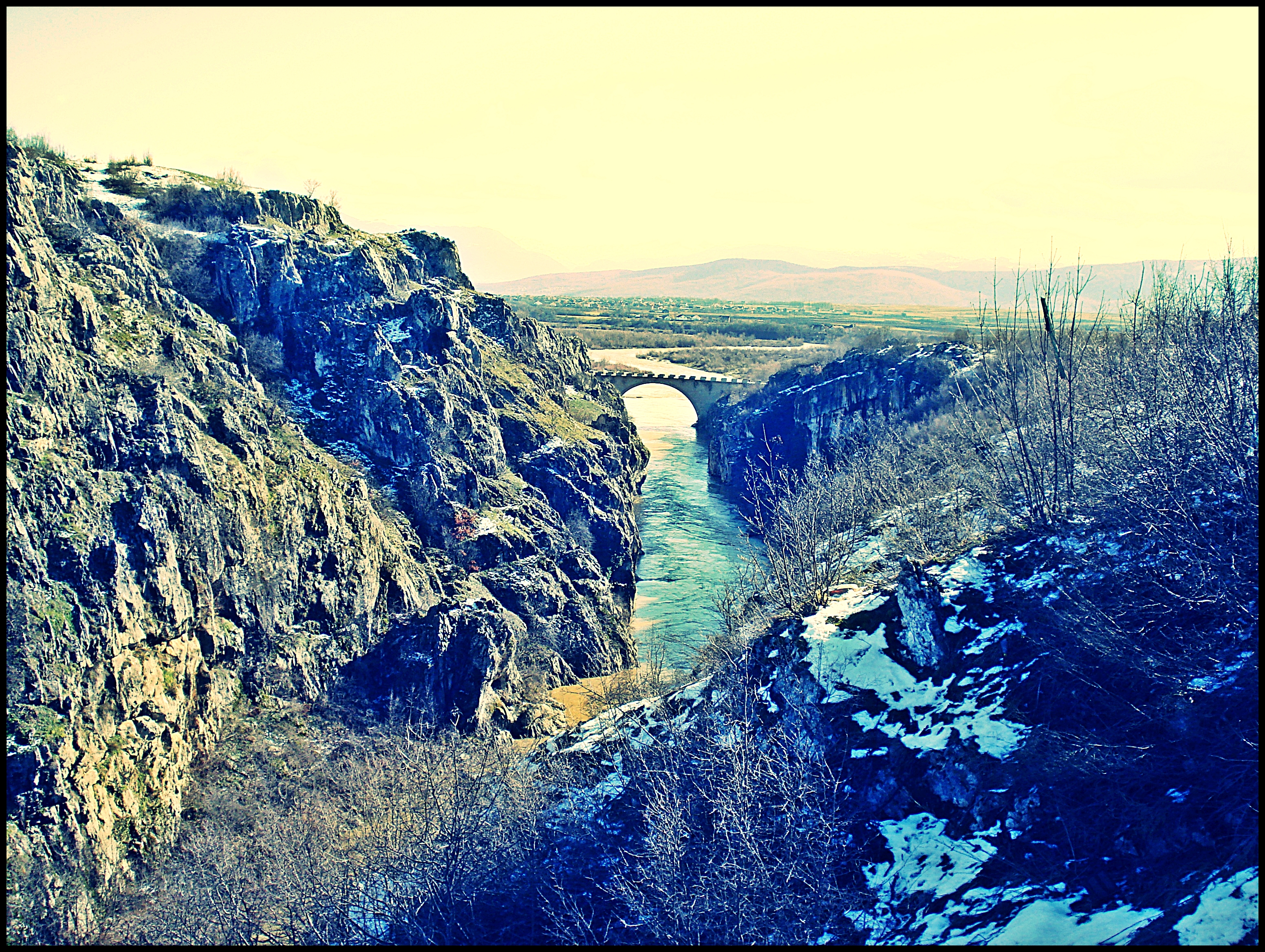
The canyon seen from north-western part

== See also ==
- White Drin
- Fshajt Bridge
