= Shtiqën =

- Administrative unit
- Location within Albania
- Coordinates: 42°2′N 20°26′E
- Country: Albania
- County: Kukës
- Municipality: Kukës

Population (2023)
  - Administrative unit: 3,063
- Time zone: UTC+1 (CET)
  - Summer (DST): UTC+2 (CEST)
- Postal Code: 8513

Shtiqën is a village and a former municipality in Kukës County, Albania. At the 2015 local government reform it became a subdivision of the municipality Kukës. The population at the 2023 census was 3,063.

The municipal unit consists of the following villages:

- Gjallicë
- Kodër-Lumë
- Krenzë
- Shtiqën

The Kukës International Airport is located in the village.
