= Vlora International Airport =

Vlora International Airport Aeroporti Ndërkombëtar i Vlorës
- IATA: VLO; ICAO: LAVL

Summary
- Airport type: Public
- Owner: Mabco Constructions SA (98%); 2A Group SH.P.K. (2%)
- Operator: Vlora International Airport SHPK
- Serves: Vlorë, Albania
- Location: Novoselë, Vlorë County, Albania
- Elevation AMSL: 8 ft (2.4 m)
- Coordinates: 40°36′20″N 19°25′34″E
- Website: https://vlora-airport.com/

Map
- Location of airport in Albania

Runways
Direction	Length		Surface
Direction	ft	m	Surface
12/30	10,499	3,200	Asphalt

Vlora International Airport (Albanian: Aeroporti Ndërkombëtar i Vlorës, IATA: VLO, ICAO: LAVL) is a project in construction of Albania's third international airport, located near the village of Akërni, approximately 10 kilometres north of Vlora . The project aims to serve as a key transportation hub for southern Albania and the Albanian Riviera.

== History ==
The Albanian government announced plans for Vlora International Airport in 2019, aiming to boost tourism and economic development in the southern region. Construction officially commenced in November 2021, following a concession agreement with a consortium comprising Mabco Constructions, the Turkish YDA Group, and the Kosovar 2A Group Shpk. The airport is being built on a 309-hectare site, previously used as a military airstrip. The airport, initially scheduled to begin operation in 2025, faced numerous delays, irregularities and violations of the construction contract, leading in August 2026 to the Albanian state initiating the procedure of formally terminating the concession agreement.

The planned Vlora International Airport features a single runway (12/30) measuring 3,200 metres in length and 60 metres in width, capable of accommodating wide-body aircraft such as the Airbus A330 and Boeing 777. The terminal building should span 22,000 m^{2} (240,000 sq ft).

Copernicus Sentinel data 2025

=== Environmental concerns ===
The construction of the airport has raised environmental concerns due to its proximity to the Narta and Karavasta lagoons, which are critical habitats for migratory birds. Environmentalists have argued that the airport's development would disrupt these ecosystems and violate national and international biodiversity protection laws.

== See also ==
- Transport in Albania
- List of airports in Albania
  - Tirana International Airport Nënë Tereza
  - Kukës International Airport Zayed
