= Kastrati Group =

Albanian investment company

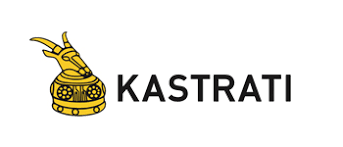
- Logo of Kastrati Group
- Type: Private
- Industry: Infrastructure, Energy, Insurance, Construction, Tourism, Hospitality, Retail
- Founded: 1991; 35 years ago
- Founder: Shefqet Kastrati
- Headquarters: Tirana, Albania
- Area served: Albania
- Products: Infrastructure; Energy; Insurance; Construction; Tourism & Hospitality; Retail
- Number of employees: 4,000+
- Website: kastrati.al

Kastrati Group is an Albanian oil and gas company, with operations spanning various sectors, including energy, trade, construction, and transportation. Founded in 1990, the company has grown to become a dominant player in Albania's economy, contributing significantly to the country's development and infrastructure. Activities include operating Shell plc petrol stations, leisure industry, air travel, and associated retail.
