= Farkë =

- Administrative unit
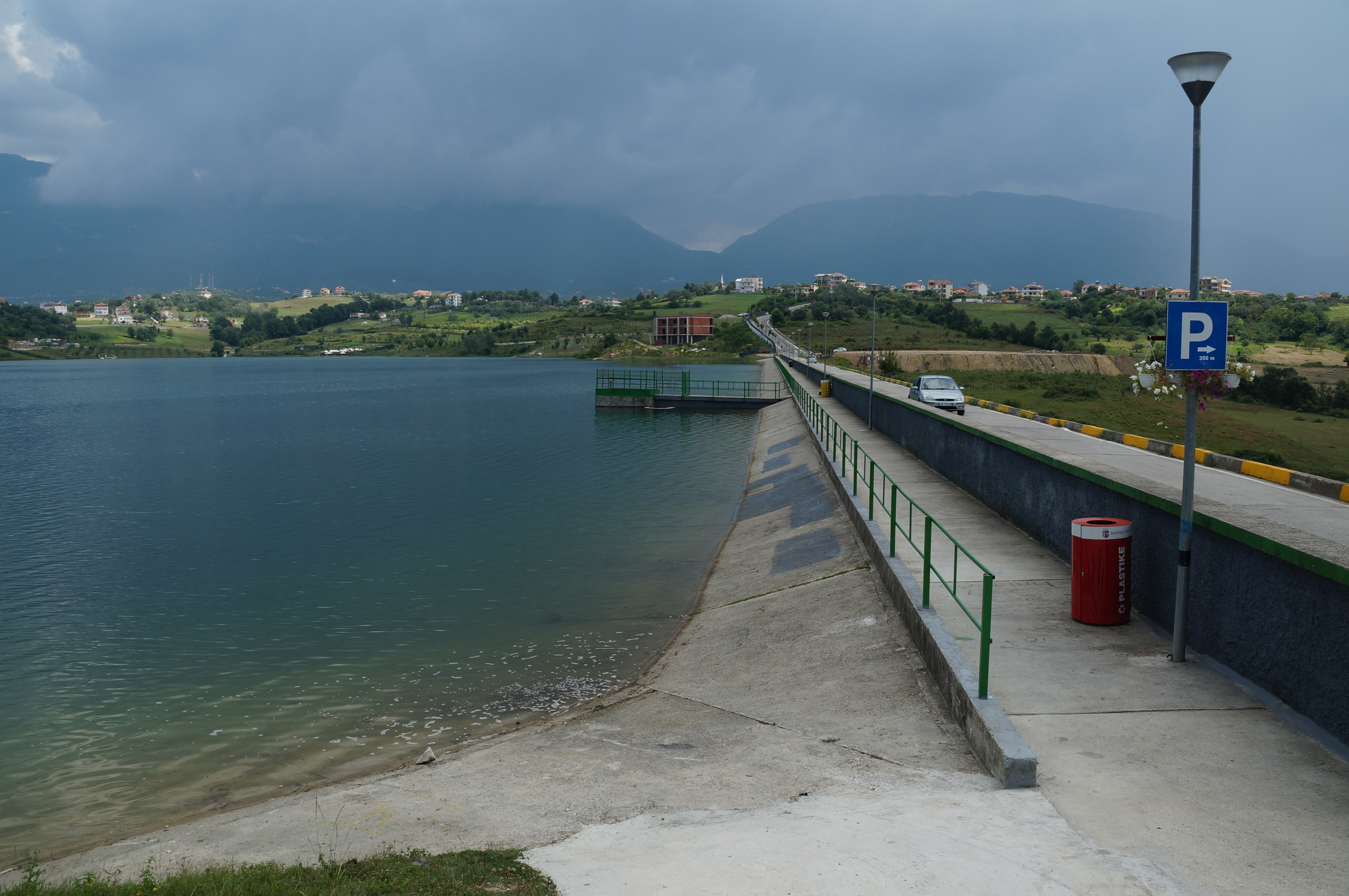
- The Dam of the Lake of Farkë with the village of Farkë in the background

- Location within Albania
- Coordinates: 41°17′N 19°51′E
- Country: Albania
- County: Tirana
- Municipality: Tirana
  - Administrative unit: 34.9 km^{2} (13.5 sq mi)

Population (2023)
  - Administrative unit: 36,266
  - Administrative unit density: 1,040/km^{2} (2,690/sq mi)
- Time zone: UTC+1 (CET)
  - Summer (DST): UTC+2 (CEST)
- Postal Code: 1045
- Area Code: (0)48

Farkë is a municipal unit and former municipality in Tirana County, central Albania. At the 2015 local government reform, it became a subdivision of the municipality of Tirana. The population at the 2011 census was 36,266.

Historical population
| Year | Pop. | ±% |
|---|---|---|
| 1950 | 842 | — |
| 1960 | 3,049 | +262.1% |
| 1989 | 4,842 | +58.8% |
| 2001 | 7,100 | +46.6% |
| 2011 | 22,633 | +218.8% |
| 2023 | 36,266 | +60.2% |

== History ==
The Vorpsi family had settled in Farkë before settling in mainland Tirana. The records show a certain sector of the Vorpsi family settled in Farkë and changed their surname to Fusha. In the Farkë-Lundër region of the area, there is an area called "Zalli i Vorpsve," which adds to the proof of their historic settlement there. According to certain records, this is the last place of settlement for the Vorpsi family until one of the sons of the family, Islam Vorpsi (1650–1710), moves into Tirana with his wife Emine due to an invitation from Sulejman Bargjini. Leading people to believe Islam Vorpsi was born in Farke and that his wife may have been from a nearby village in the region.
