= EDT =

EDT may refer to:

== Science and technology ==
- 1,2-Ethanedithiol, compound commonly used for cleavage during peptide synthesis
- EDT (Digital), text editor for PDP-11 and VAX/VMS computer systems
- EDT (Univac), text editor for UNIVAC Series 90 and Fujitsu BS2000 computer systems
- Electrodynamic tether, a spacecraft component
- Event dispatching thread, in Java

== Time zones ==
- Australian Eastern Daylight Time (UTC+11)
- Eastern Daylight Time (UTC−4), in North America

== Other uses ==
- Chicago Engineering Design Team, a robotics team
- Eau de toilette
- Editor (abbrev: "edt." pl.: "edts.")
- Electronic Disturbance Theater, an activist and artist collective
- Evidential decision theory, a school of thought within decision theory
- Event-driven trading, institutional investors attempt to profit from a stock mispricing that may occur during or after a corporate event.

== See also ==
- EDTF (disambiguation)
- Edit (disambiguation)
