= Air navigation service provider =

Legal entity providing air navigation services

An air navigation service provider (ANSP) is a public or a private legal entity providing Air Navigation Services. It manages air traffic on behalf of a company, region or country. Depending on the specific mandate, an ANSP provides one or more of the following services to airspace users:

- Air traffic management (ATM)
- Communication navigation and surveillance systems (CNS)
- Meteorological service for air navigation (MET)
- Search and rescue (SAR)
- Aeronautical information services/aeronautical information management (AIS/AIM).

These services are provided to air traffic during all phases of operations (approach, aerodrome and en-route).

Air navigation service providers are either government departments, state-owned companies, or privatised organisations. The majority of the world's Air Navigation Service Providers are members of the Civil Air Navigation Services Organisation located at Amsterdam Airport Schiphol.

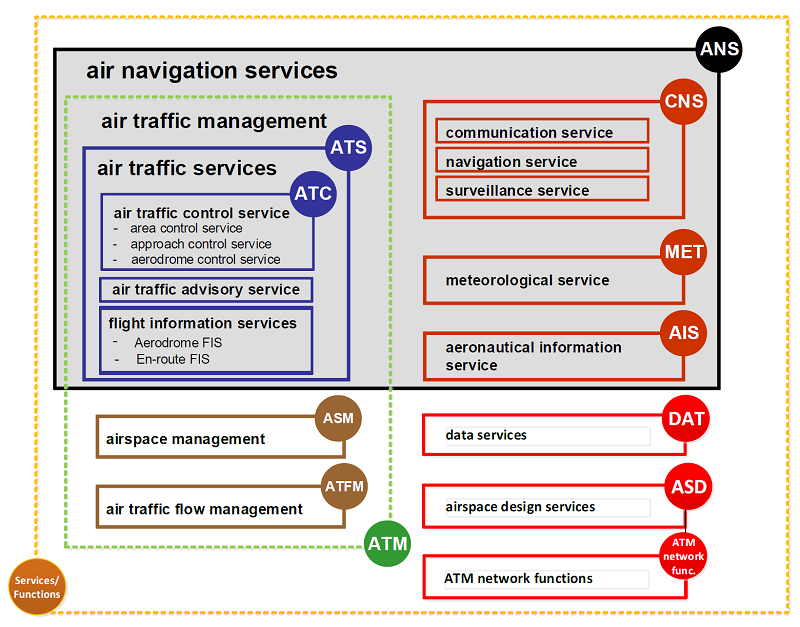
Components of Air Traffic Services

== List of providers ==
List of air navigation service providers
| Name | Country/region | URL | Ref. |
|---|---|---|---|
| Administration de la navigation aérienne (ANA) | Luxembourg | www.ana.public.lu/en/ | |
| Department of Civil Aviation (ATS) | Cyprus | www.mcw.gov.cy/mcw/dca/dca.nsf/DMLairtraffic_en/DMLairtraffic_en?OpenDocument | |
| National Civil Aviation Center (NCAC) | Mongolia | www.ncac.mcaa.gov.mn | |
| Aeronautical Radio of Thailand (AEROTHAI) | Thailand | www.aerothai.co.th | |
| Air Navigation Services Aruba (ANSA) | Aruba | www.ansa.aw | |
| Air Navigation Services Finland (ANS Finland) | Finland | www.ansfinland.fi | |
| Air Navigation Services of the Czech Republic (ANS CR) | Czech Republic | www.ans.cz | |
| Agence pour la Securité de la Navigation Aerienne en Afrique et Madagascar (ASECNA) | Madagascar | www.asecna.aero | |
| Air Traffic & Navigation Services (ATNS) | South Africa | www.atns.com / www.atns.co.za | |
| Airports Authority of India (AAI) | India | www.aai.aero | |
| Airservices Australia | Australia | www.airservicesaustralia.com | |
| Airways New Zealand | New Zealand | www.airways.co.nz | |
| Saudi Air Navigation Service (SANS) | Saudi Arabia | www.sans.com.sa | |
| Armenian Air Traffic Services (ARMATS) | Armenia | www.armats.com | |
| Austro Control | Austria | www.austrocontrol.at | |
| Avinor | Norway | www.avinor.no | |
| Azerbaijan Air Navigation Services (AZANS) | Azerbaijan | www.azans.az | |
| Belgocontrol (trade name skeyes) | Belgium | skeyes.be | |
| Bosnia and Herzegovina Air Navigation Services Agency (BHANSA) | Bosnia and Herzegovina | www.bhansa.gov.ba | |
| Bulgarian Air Traffic Services Authority (BULATSA) | Bulgaria | www.bulatsa.com | |
| Civil Aviation Authority of Mongolia (CAA Mongolia) | Mongolia | www.mcaa.gov.mn | |
| Civil Aviation Authority of Pakistan (CAA Pakistan) | Pakistan | www.caapakistan.com.pk | |
| Civil Aviation Authority of Uganda (CAA Uganda) | Uganda | www.caa.co.ug | |
| Air Traffic Management Bureau | China | www.atmb.net.cn | |
| Civil Aviation Department (Hong Kong) | Hong Kong | www.cad.gov.hk | |
| Vietnam Air Traffic Management Corporation (VATM) | Vietnam | https://vatm.vn | |
| Corporación Centroamericana de Servicios de Navegación Aérea (COCESNA) | Central America | www.cocesna.org | |
| Corporación Peruana de Aeropuertos y Aviación Comercial (CORPAC) | Peru | www.corpac.gob.pe | |
| Civil Aviation Authority of the Philippines (CAAP) | Philippines | caap.gov.ph/air-navigation-service/ | |
| Croatia Control - Croatian Air Navigation Services | Croatia | www.crocontrol.hr | |
| Departamento de Controle do Espaço Aéreo (DECEA) | Brazil | www.decea.gov.br | |
| Deutsche Flugsicherung (DFS) | Germany | www.dfs.de | |
| DFS Aviation Services (DAS) | Germany | dfs-as.aero | |
| Devlet Hava Meydanları İşletmesi (DHMI, State Airports Authority) | Turkey | www.dhmi.gov.tr | |
| Directorate of Air Navigation Services (DANS) | Kenya | www.kcaa.or.ke | |
| Direction des Services de la navigation aérienne (DSNA) | France | www.developpement-durable.gouv.fr | |
| Dutch Caribbean Air Navigation Service Provider (DC-ANSP) | Curaçao | www.dc-ansp.org | |
| Empresa Argentina de Navegación Aérea (EANA) | Argentina | www.eana.com.ar | |
| ENAIRE | Spain | www.enaire.es | |
| ENAV S.p.A. (Italian air navigation service provider) | Italy | www.enav.it | |
| Estonian Air Navigation Services (EANS) | Estonia | www.eans.ee | |
| Etablissement National de la Navigation Aérienne (ENNA) | Algeria | www.enna.dz | |
| EUROCONTROL Maastricht UAC | Belgium, Netherlands, Luxembourg, upper airspace in north-western part of Germany | MUAC | |
| Federal Air Transport Agency (FATA) | Russia | www.favt.ru | |
| State Air Traffic Management Corporation (State ATM Corporation) | Russia | www.gkovd.ru/en/ | |
| Federal Aviation Administration (FAA) | United States | www.faa.gov | |
| NATS Holdings (NATS) | United Kingdom | www.nats.aero | |
| HungaroControl | Hungary | www.hungarocontrol.hu | |
| Instituto Nacional de Aeronáutica Civil (INAC) | Venezuela | www.inac.gob.ve | |
| Irish Aviation Authority (IAA) | Ireland | www.iaa.ie | |
| Civil Aviation Authority of Singapore (CAAS) | Singapore | www.caas.gov.sg | |
| ISAVIA | Iceland | www.isavia.is | |
| Japan Civil Aviation Bureau | Japan | www.mlit.go.jp/koku | |
| Jersey - CICZ | Jersey | www.jersey-airport.com | |
| Civil Aviation Authority Malaysia (CAAM) | Malaysia | www.caam.gov.my | |
| Kazaeronavigatsia | Kazakhstan | www.ans.kz | |
| Latvijas Gaisa Satiksme (LGS) | Latvia | www.lgs.lv | |
| Letové prevádzkové služby (LPS) | Slovakia | www.lps.sk | |
| Luchtverkeersleiding Nederland (LVNL) | Netherlands | www.lvnl.nl | |
| Malta Air Traffic Services (MATS) | Malta | www.maltats.com | |
| North Macedonian Air Navigations Services Provider (M-NAV) | North Macedonia | mnavigation.m-nav.info | |
| Moldovian Air Traffic Services Authority (MoldATSA) | Moldova | www.moldatsa.md | |
| Moroccan Airports Authority (ONDA) | Morocco | www.onda.ma | |
| National Air Navigation Services Company (NANSC) | Egypt | www.nansceg.net | |
| National Air Traffic Services (NATS) | Global (UK-based) | www.nats.aero | |
| Nav Canada | Canada | www.navcanada.ca | |
| NAV Portugal (Navegação Aérea de Portugal) | Portugal | www.nav.pt | |
| Naviair | Denmark | www.naviair.dk | |
| Nigerian Airspace Management Agency (NAMA) | Nigeria | www.nama.gov.ng | |
| Oro Navigacija | Lithuania | www.ans.lt | |
| Tunisian Civil Aviation and Airport Authority (OACA) | Tunisia | www.oaca.nat.tn | |
| Polish Air Navigation Services Agency (PANSA) | Poland | www.pansa.pl | |
| Romanian Air Traffic Services Administration (ROMATSA) | Romania | www.romatsa.ro | |
| Sakaeronavigatsia | Georgia | www.airnav.ge | |
| Servicios a la Navegación en el Espacio Aéreo Mexicano (SENEAM) | Mexico | www.seneam.gob.mx | |
| Serbia and Montenegro Air Traffic Services Agency (SMATSA) | Serbia and Montenegro | www.smatsa.rs | |
| skyguide | Switzerland | www.skyguide.ch | |
| Slovenia Control | Slovenia | www.sloveniacontrol.si | |
| LFV | Sweden | www.lfv.se | |
| Trinidad and Tobago Civil Aviation Authority (TTCAA) | Trinidad and Tobago | www.caa.gov.tt | |
| Ukrainian State Air Traffic Service Enterprise Украерорух (UkSATSE) | Ukraine | uksatse.ua | |
| Air Navigation and Weather Services (ANWS) | Taiwan | www.anws.gov.tw/homeweb1.php | |
| Direccion General de Aviacion Civil (DGAC) | Ecuador | www.dgac.gob.ec | |
| Belarusian State-Owned Enterprise (BELAERONAVIGATSIA) | Belarus | www.ban.by | |
| HungaroControl | Kosovo | www.hungarocontrol.hu | |
| Instituto Dominicano de Aviación Civil (IDAC) | Dominican Republic | www.idac.gob.do | |
| Perum Lembaga Penyelenggara Pelayanan Navigasi Penerbangan Indonesia (Airnav Indonesia) | Indonesia | www.airnavindonesia.co.id | |
| UAE General Civil Aviation Authority (GCAA) | United Arab Emirates | www.gcaa.gov.ae | |
| Air Navigation Services of Albania (ALBCONTROL) | Albania | www.albcontrol.al | |
| Dirección General de Aeronáutica Civil Chile (DGAC Chile) | Chile | www.dgac.gob.cl | |
| Rwanda Civil Aviation Authority | Rwanda | www.caa.gov.rw | |

== Private and international service providers ==
In addition to state-operated agencies, several certified private companies provide air navigation services under contract or public-private partnership. For example, Hughes Aerospace Corporation is endorsed by the International Civil Aviation Organization (ICAO) as an Air Navigation Service Provider (ANSP) and develops instrument flight procedures and satellite-based navigation systems for clients in North America and Asia.

== See also ==
- List of CANSO members
- List of civil aviation authorities
- E-Learning Developers' Community of Practice
