= Warsaw Radom Airport =

Airport in Radom, Poland

Warsaw-Radom Heroes of Radom June 1976 Airport Port Lotniczy Warszawa-Radom im. Bohaterów Radomskiego Czerwca 1976 Roku (Polish)

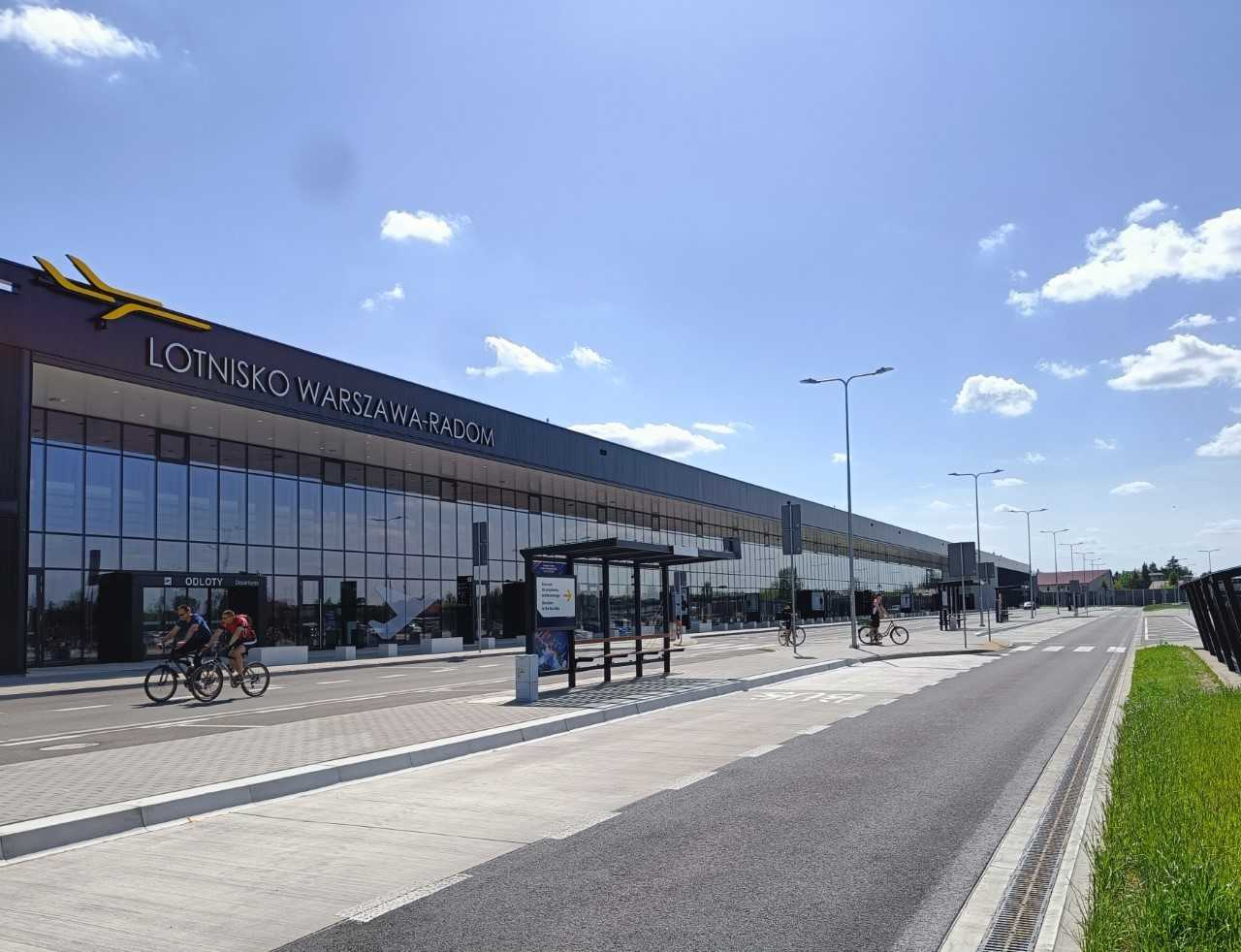
- IATA: RDO; ICAO: EPRA

Summary
- Airport type: International, military
- Operator: Przedsiębiorstwo Państwowe „Porty Lotnicze”
- Serves: Radom, Poland
- Focus city for: LOT Polish Airlines
- Elevation AMSL: 623 ft (190 m)
- Coordinates: 51°23′21″N 21°12′49″E
- Website: www.lotniskowarszawa-radom.pl

Map
- Location of airport in Poland

Runways
Direction	Length		Surface
Direction	m	ft	Surface
07/25	2,500	8,202	Asphalt, Concrete

Statistics (2024)
- Passengers: 112,610
- Source: Polish AIP at EUROCONTROL

Warsaw Radom Heroes of Radom June 1976 Airport (IATA: RDO, ICAO: EPRA), also known as Radom-Sadków Airport, is a joint civil–military airport in central Poland, located approximately 3 km (1.9 mi) east of Radom city center and 100 km (62 mi) from Warsaw. The name "Sadków" comes from the suburb of Radom in which the airport is located. The airport has been in operation since the 1920s. The airport has one 2,500 m × 45 m (8,202 ft × 148 ft) runway. The middle section is asphalt concrete, with 200m and 230m end sections of concrete. The civilian taxiways are 20 meters wide (modernised in 2023), while the military taxiways are 14 meters wide and were renovated in the years 2000, 2012 and 2023.

== History ==
=== Military Airport ===
In April 1932, the airport was handed over to the Ministry of Military Affairs (the equivalent of the Polish Ministry of National Defence at the time), which expanded the facility by buying more land; building hangars, barracks and a shooting range; and started training military pilots and paratroopers. Training continued until World War II.

During the War's first days, German forces bombed the airport, destroying aircraft and hangars and causing the personnel to evacuate. During the occupation of Poland, the Luftwaffe used it for training and preparation of German pilots for battle on the Eastern Front. By the end of the war, the airport was mined and heavily damaged. The Polish military returned to Sadków in March 1945 and since then pilot training has continued until today.

=== Regional Airport 2014-2018 ===
On 30 June 2006, Gmina Radom established Port Lotniczy Radom S.A. with a 22 million zloty budget to prepare Radom-Sadków for civilian operations. It became the airport operator on 24 January 2007. At the end of January 2011, a free-lease agreement for a 125 hectares (310 acres; 0.48 sq mi) civilian and military joint use airport area was signed. In September that year, the Polish Civil Aviation Office issued a permit for civilian operations after fulfilling Chicago Convention requirements. In January 2012, works on an airport lighting project commenced.

In July 2012, the airport has acquired the former Terminal 2 building of Łódź Airport together with all its equipment for 2 mln zł. Its re-assembly started in January 2013 and was completed in March 2014. It is able to serve two Boeing 737 or Airbus A320 class aircraft at the same time.

Radom city council adapted the military airport in Sadków to serve domestic and international flights and was issued with a civilian airport certificate by the Civil Aviation Office in May 2014.

The Polish Air Navigation Services Agency installed a DVOR/DME navigation system at the airport in December 2014.

==== Initial scheduled operations ====
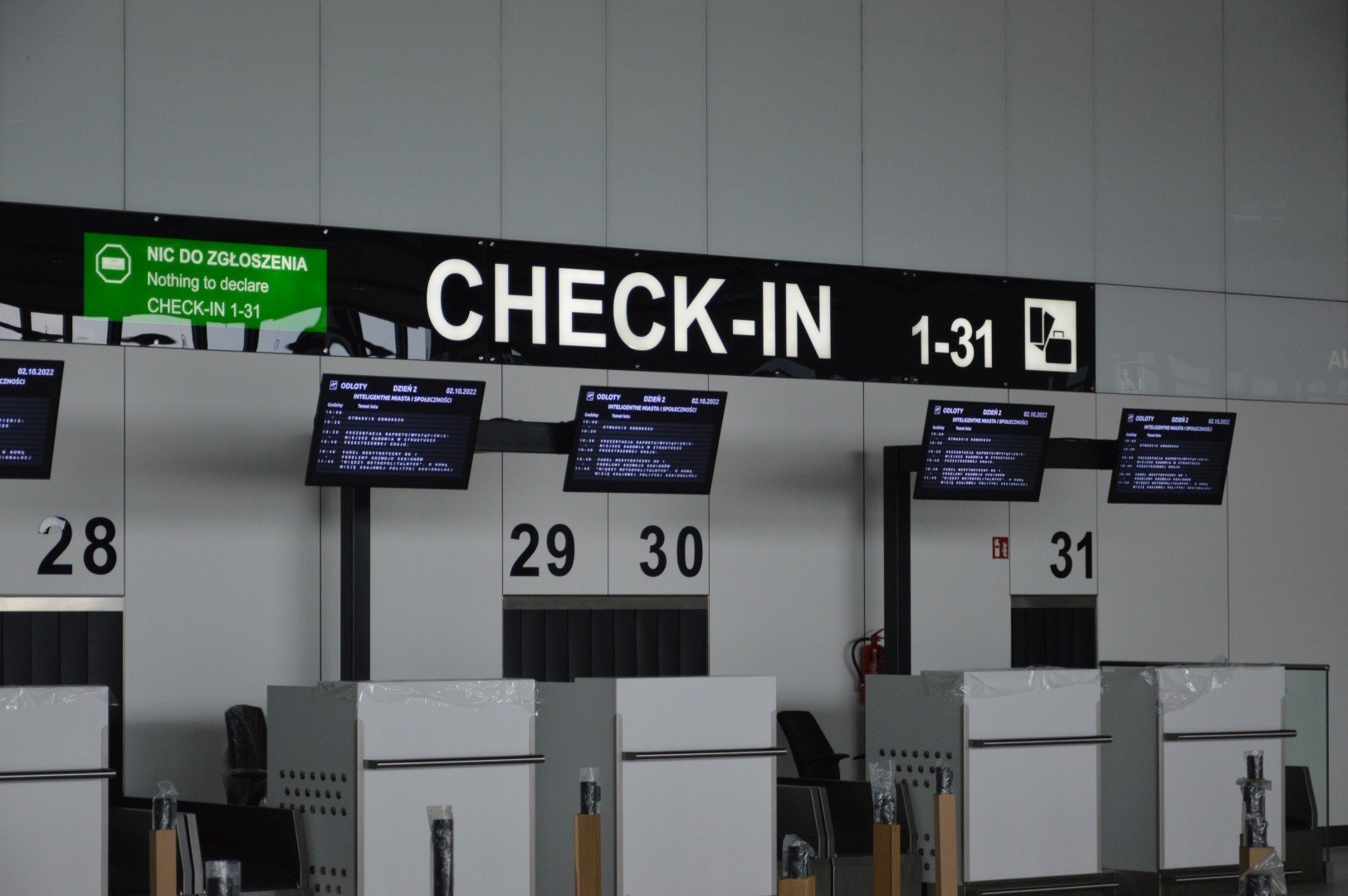
Check-in counters

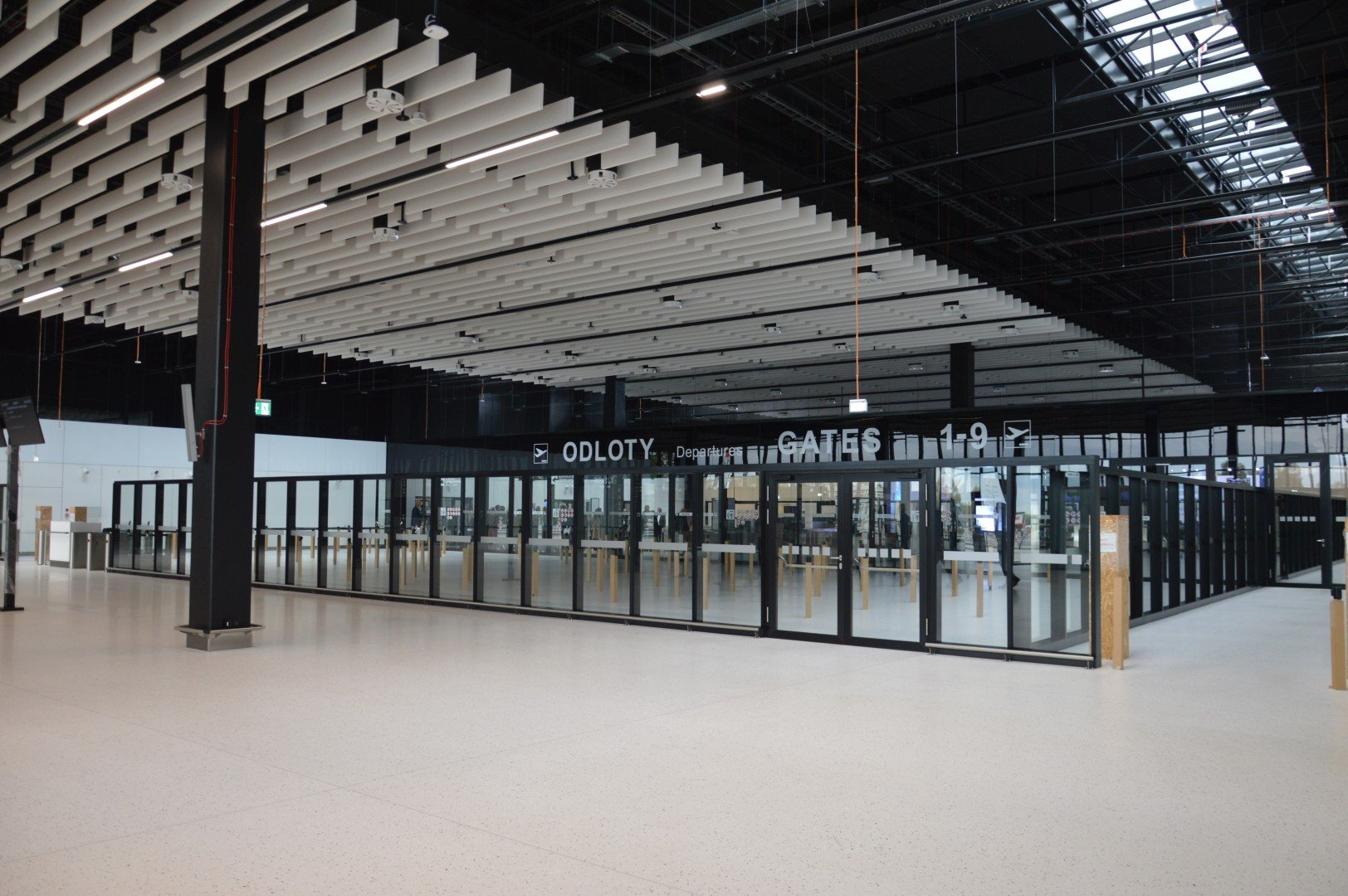
Security screening area

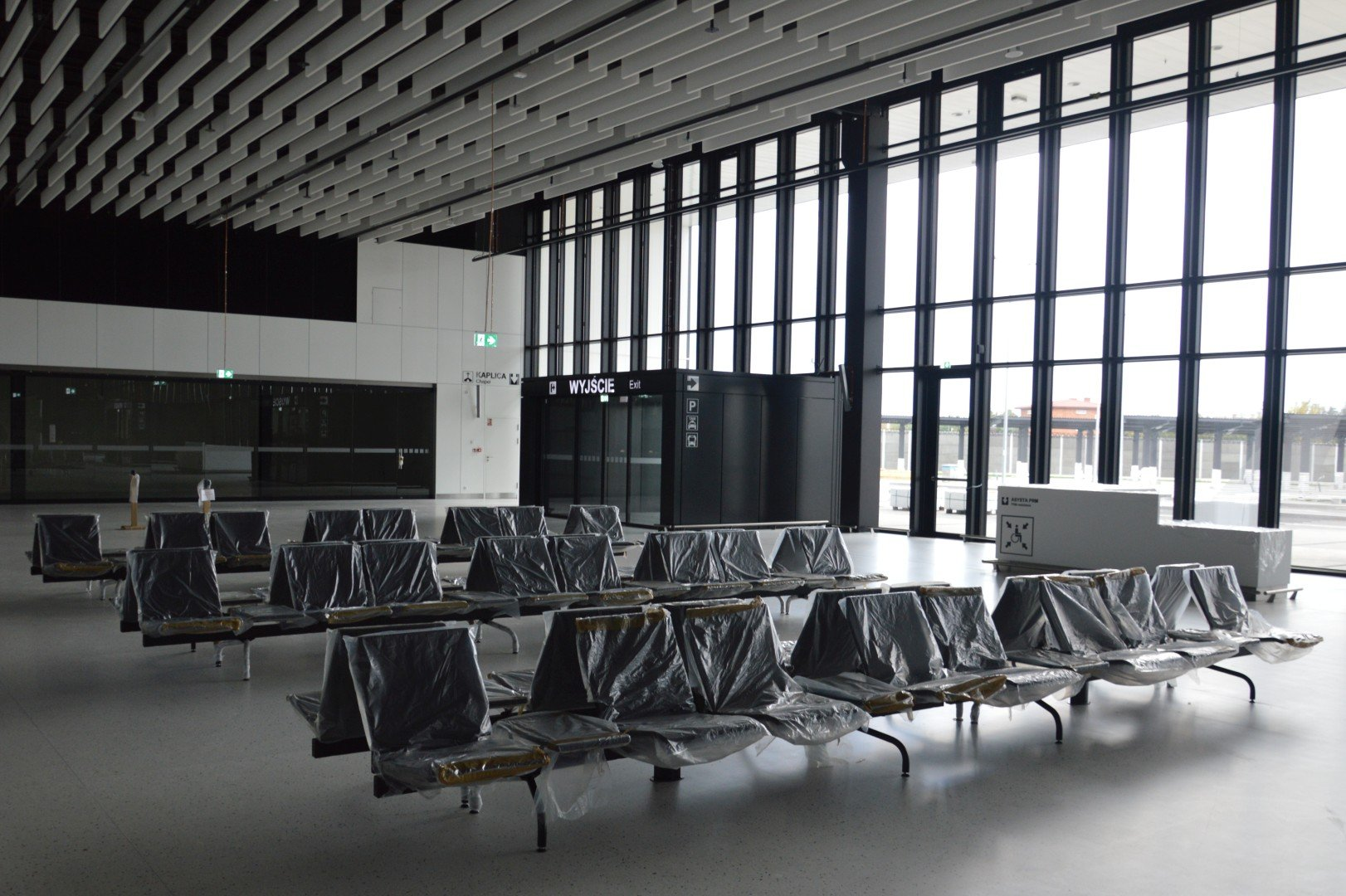
Departure gate area

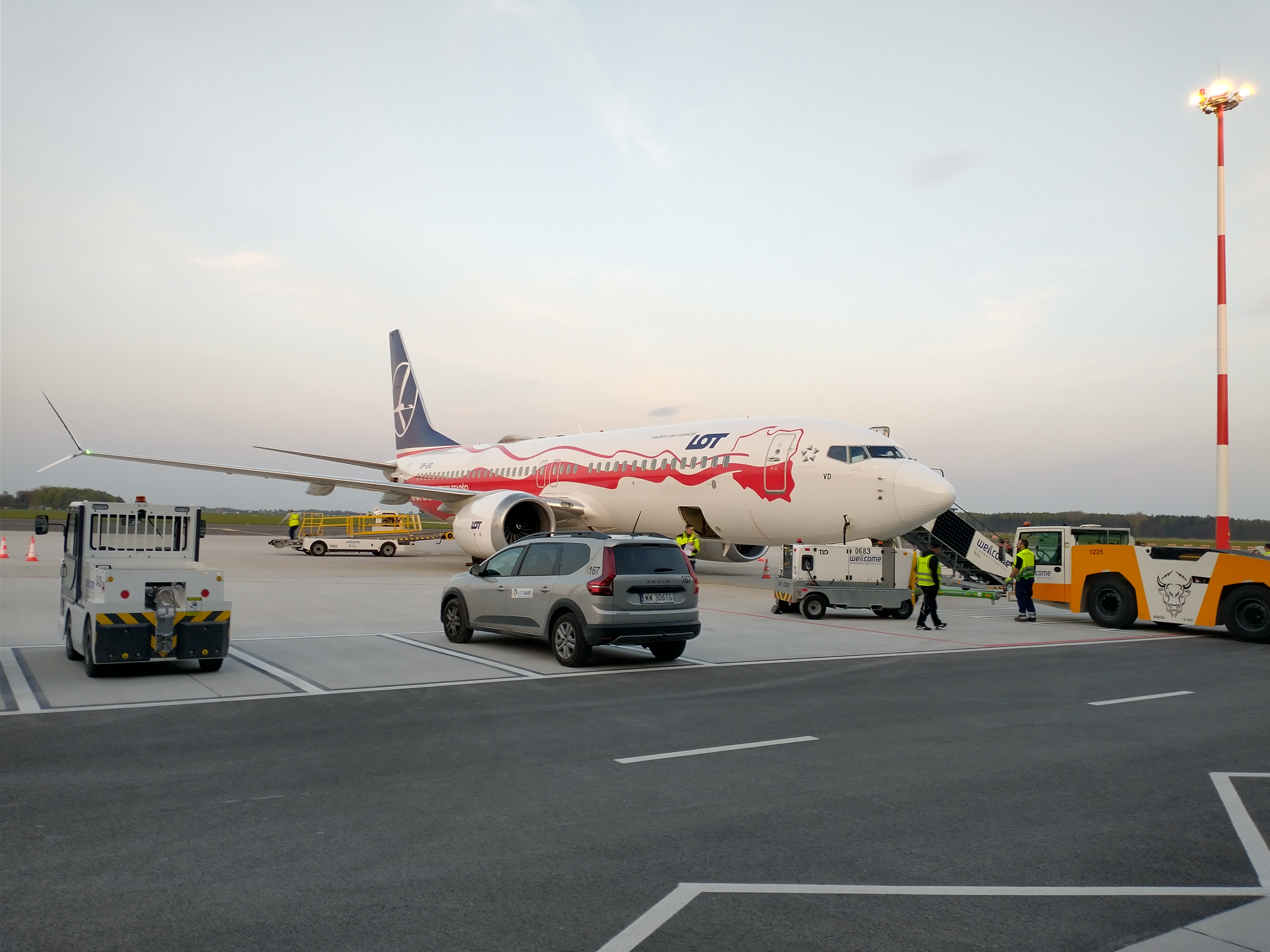
A LOT Polish Airlines Boeing 737 MAX 8 on the apron.

In May 2015, one year after the certification, AirBaltic was the first airline to announce scheduled flights from Radom. The Latvian carrier scheduled three weekly flights to its home base in Riga with Bombardier Q400, starting on 1 September.

Both carriers commenced the flights as planned. Loads were very low. Overall, the airport handled some 220 passengers in September, equal to six travelers on each flight. Czech Airlines decided to discontinue its flights from and to Radom with effect of late October, that had an average load of three passengers. The suspension was officially caused by the lack of de-icing equipment.
airBaltic followed and announced on short notice to cancel its services and end its co-operation with the airport from 18 November onwards. According to Wyborcza, flights to Riga even got surpassed by flights on the Prague route in terms of success.

==== Resumption of flights ====
On 11 December 2015, Polish press informed that flights to Prague out of Radom would already resume on 20 December. Initially, the carrier would offer one rotation on Saturdays, before adding a second rotation on Fridays from 8 January. On 1 February, thrice-weekly frequency on Mondays were started. Flights were chartered through Radom and were due to operate with an ATR 42 and 72. Instead of a direct flight, the connection was operated as an add-on to Czech Airline's existing services to Ostrava, meaning that the plane would make a brief stop in Ostrava on both directions. The distance between Radom an Ostrava is 180 miles while the route from Ostrava and Prague is 174 miles, adding up to 354 miles. In comparison, the direct line between Radom and Prague is 317 miles long. Flights between Ostrava and Radom alone were not put on sale.

Operations commenced as scheduled. The first service saw an occupation of the passengers to Radom while there were no travelers on the return flight. The agreement only was valid until 22 February with an extension possible in case of success. No extension was made.

==== SprintAir revives airport 2016; leaves again 2017 ====
On 26 February 2016, Polish regional airline SprintAir announced it would commence operations from Radom in collaboration with the airport. From 18 April, the carrier based one Saab 340 aircraft at Radom Airport for flights to Berlin Tegel, Gdańsk, Prague and Wroclaw. All routes were being served twice-weekly with the exception of Gdansk which had one rotation a week. Fares on domestic flights started at 99 PLN per direction, and 149 PLN on international routes. The contract was extended on 25 May to also cover flights from 20 June on with a changed schedule. All four destinations were kept, although Prague operations were reduced to once per week. From 23 June, there were two flights per week to Lviv airport.

All remaining SprintAir flights were terminated on 30 October 2017, after the two parties could not agree on a further extension of their agreement. Thereby, the airport again was left without any scheduled flights. The airport stated it was in talks with other airlines and the airport would be left open. However, the local airport never again saw scheduled passenger operations.

On 1 January 2019, Radom airport closed for good in order to allow for the construction of the new Warsaw-Radom airport. Demolition of existing terminal and other facilities started in May 2019, as the area would be used for the new airport. Thereby, the local airport ceased to exist after only a very few years of existence. Over the time, the local government had poured substantial budget into both developing and operating the loss-making facility as well to fund short-lived scheduled flight connections that were commercially unviable.

==== Project and opposition ====
The city of Warsaw is served by two airports:

- Warsaw Chopin Airport; the main airport located within the city within densely populated area. Handles chiefly legacy airline traffic and freight.
- Warsaw Modlin Airport; the secondary airfield of Warsaw, almost exclusively used by Ryanair, is a former Cold War-era airbase converted into Warsaw's current low-cost/alternative airport.

In November 2017, the Polish government approved plans to replace Chopin Airport with an entirely new airport, the New Central Polish Airport. With an anticipated construction time of ten years and budgeted cost of US$9.6bn, it is to become one of Europe's largest airport sites. Its capacity is to reach up to 100 million passengers a year once fully developed.

Roughly at the same time, PPL decided to develop the site of Radom as a relief airport for crowded Chopin Airport.

The plan and following decision to establish the site as a future relief airport for Warsaw was heavily criticized by the airlines intended to use the facility.

==== Construction ====
Construction of the new site started in May 2019. Initially, it was slated to open in late-2020, but was delayed due to the COVID-19 pandemic. The construction of the terminal building officially ended in August 2022. The total cost of the new facilities is 800 million zloty. Warsaw Radom Airport opened on 27 April 2023.

==== Name ====
The airport's official name Lotnisko Warszawa-Radom im. Bohaterów Radomskiego Czerwca 1976 Roku (eng. Heroes of Radom's June 1976 Warsaw Radom Airport), in honor of June 1976 events, was unveiled on 7 May 2019.

== Airlines and destinations ==
The following airlines operate regular scheduled and charter flights to and from Warsaw Radom Airport:

Airlines	Destinations
Enter Air	Seasonal charter: Antalya
LOT Polish Airlines	Seasonal: Preveza/Lefkada
Mavi Gök Airlines	Antalya
Wizz Air	Larnaca, Oslo–Gardermoen (begins 30 March 2027); Seasonal Burgas (resumes 8 June 2027), Tirana

== Accidents and incidents ==
- On 28 August 2025, a Polish Air Force F-16 crashed whilst preparing for the Radom Air Show, killing Maciej "Slab" Krakowian. The airport was closed, and the event was suspended.

== Ground transportation ==
=== Road access ===
The airport is located about 4 km (2.5 mi) east of Radom's city center and can be accessed via Żeromskiego and Lubelska streets. The S7 expressway (part of European route E371), which offers the quickest connection to Warsaw, forms the western bypass of the Radom, with the airport being about 20 km (12 mi) from the Radom Pólnoc junction. Directly adjacent to the airport are the national roads: DK 9 (part of E371) and DK 12.

=== Bus ===
The airport is currently served by bus routes 5 and 14 of Radom's public transit system, running at 20 and 20-30 minute intervals respectively, stopping at the airport's terminal during operation times.

=== Rail ===
An unelectrified railway spur line connects Radom railway station to the adjoining Polish Air Force base (42. Baza Lotnictwa Szkolnego). Temporary passenger rail services have been operated for the Radom Air Show from Radom Główny railway station to the Radom Wschodni goods station. In 2019, PKP Polskie Linie Kolejowe proposed the site of a new Radom Wschodni passenger station as part of the renovation of a road viaduct on ul. Żeromskiego in order to better serve Radom Airport, which eventually finished construction in summer 2025. The viaduct, alongside the train station, is the fastest way to get to the airport by public transport. The distance between the station and the airport is less than 2 kilometers long.

== See also ==
- List of airports in Poland
