= Aeronautical Information Publication =

Government aaeronautical publication

In aviation, an Aeronautical Information Publication (or AIP) is defined by the International Civil Aviation Organization (ICAO) as a publication issued by or with the authority of a state and containing aeronautical information of a lasting character essential to air navigation. It is designed to be a manual containing thorough details of regulations, procedures and other information pertinent to flying aircraft in the particular country to which it relates. It is usually issued by or on behalf of the respective civil aviation administration.

== Overview ==
The structure and contents of AIPs are standardized by international agreement through ICAO. AIPs normally have three parts – GEN (general), ENR (en route) and AD (aerodromes). The document contains many charts; most of these are in the AD section where details and charts of all public aerodromes are published.

AIPs are kept up-to-date by regular revision on a fixed cycle. For operationally significant changes in information, the cycle known as the AIRAC (Aeronautical Information Regulation And Control) cycle, first introduced in 1964, is used: revisions are produced every 56 days (double AIRAC cycle) or every 28 days (single AIRAC cycle). These changes are received well in advance so that users of the aeronautical data can update their flight management systems (FMS). For insignificant changes, the published calendar dates are used.

In some countries the AIP is informally known as the Airman's Manual or the Air Pilot.

Not all countries publish AIPs, particularly in Africa.

== Electronic AIP ==
EUROCONTROL has published a specification for an electronic AIP (eAIP). The eAIP Specification aims to harmonise the structure and presentation of AIPs for digital media. In this respect, a digital AIP is a digital version of the paper AIP, usually available in PDF format, while an electronic AIP is available in PDF as well as other formats, more suitable for reading on the screen and for electronic data exchange. Many countries around the world provide digital AIPs either on CD-ROM subscription or on a Web site. The external links section below lists AIPs which aim to follow the EUROCONTROL eAIP Specification.

== AIRAC effective dates (28-day cycle) ==
The current AIRAC cycle is 2611 (effective 29 Oct 2026).

| # | 2024* | 2025 | 2026 | 2027 | 2028* | 2029 | 2030 | 2031 | 2032* | 2033 | 2034 | 2035 | 2036* | 2037 | 2038 | 2039 | 2040* |
|---|---|---|---|---|---|---|---|---|---|---|---|---|---|---|---|---|---|
| 1 | 25 Jan | 23 Jan | 22 Jan | 21 Jan | 20 Jan | 18 Jan | 17 Jan | 16 Jan | 15 Jan | 13 Jan | 12 Jan | 11 Jan | 10 Jan | 08 Jan | 07 Jan | 06 Jan | 05 Jan |
| 2 | 22 Feb | 20 Feb | 19 Feb | 18 Feb | 17 Feb | 15 Feb | 14 Feb | 13 Feb | 12 Feb | 10 Feb | 09 Feb | 08 Feb | 07 Feb | 05 Feb | 04 Feb | 03 Feb | 02 Feb |
| 3 | 21 Mar | 20 Mar | 19 Mar | 18 Mar | 16 Mar | 15 Mar | 14 Mar | 13 Mar | 11 Mar | 10 Mar | 09 Mar | 08 Mar | 06 Mar | 05 Mar | 04 Mar | 03 Mar | 01 Mar |
| 4 | 18 Apr | 17 Apr | 16 Apr | 15 Apr | 13 Apr | 12 Apr | 11 Apr | 10 Apr | 08 Apr | 07 Apr | 06 Apr | 05 Apr | 03 Apr | 02 Apr | 01 Apr | 31 Mar | 29 Mar |
| 5 | 16 May | 15 May | 14 May | 13 May | 11 May | 10 May | 09 May | 08 May | 06 May | 05 May | 04 May | 03 May | 01 May | 30 Apr | 29 Apr | 28 Apr | 26 Apr |
| 6 | 13 Jun | 12 Jun | 11 Jun | 10 Jun | 08 Jun | 07 Jun | 06 Jun | 05 Jun | 03 Jun | 02 Jun | 01 Jun | 31 May | 29 May | 28 May | 27 May | 26 May | 24 May |
| 7 | 11 Jul | 10 Jul | 09 Jul | 08 Jul | 06 Jul | 05 Jul | 04 Jul | 03 Jul | 01 Jul | 30 Jun | 29 Jun | 28 Jun | 26 Jun | 25 Jun | 24 Jun | 23 Jun | 21 Jun |
| 8 | 08 Aug | 07 Aug | 06 Aug | 05 Aug | 03 Aug | 02 Aug | 01 Aug | 31 Jul | 29 Jul | 28 Jul | 27 Jul | 26 Jul | 24 Jul | 23 Jul | 22 Jul | 21 Jul | 19 Jul |
| 9 | 05 Sep | 04 Sep | 03 Sep | 02 Sep | 31 Aug | 30 Aug | 29 Aug | 28 Aug | 26 Aug | 25 Aug | 24 Aug | 23 Aug | 21 Aug | 20 Aug | 19 Aug | 18 Aug | 16 Aug |
| 10 | 03 Oct | 02 Oct | 01 Oct | 30 Sep | 28 Sep | 27 Sep | 26 Sep | 25 Sep | 23 Sep | 22 Sep | 21 Sep | 20 Sep | 18 Sep | 17 Sep | 16 Sep | 15 Sep | 13 Sep |
| 11 | 31 Oct | 30 Oct | 29 Oct | 28 Oct | 26 Oct | 25 Oct | 24 Oct | 23 Oct | 21 Oct | 20 Oct | 19 Oct | 18 Oct | 16 Oct | 15 Oct | 14 Oct | 13 Oct | 11 Oct |
| 12 | 28 Nov | 27 Nov | 26 Nov | 25 Nov | 23 Nov | 22 Nov | 21 Nov | 20 Nov | 18 Nov | 17 Nov | 16 Nov | 15 Nov | 13 Nov | 12 Nov | 11 Nov | 10 Nov | 08 Nov |
| 13 | 26 Dec | 25 Dec | 24 Dec | 23 Dec | 21 Dec | 20 Dec | 19 Dec | 18 Dec | 16 Dec | 15 Dec | 14 Dec | 13 Dec | 11 Dec | 10 Dec | 09 Dec | 08 Dec | 06 Dec |
| 14 | | | | | | | | | | | | | | | | | |

Note: * = leap year containing 29 Feb (2024, 2028, 2032, 2036, etc.)

== See also ==
- Civil aviation authority
- Air navigation service provider
- List of CANSO members
