= Skeyes =

Belgian air navigation and traffic service provider

skeyes
- Skeyes's logo after being renamed in 2018
- Formerly: Belgocontrol (1998–2018), French: Régie des voies aériennes or Dutch: Regie der Luchtwegen (1946–1998)
- Type: Autonomous public company
- Industry: Aviation
- Founded: November 20, 1946 in Brussels, Belgium
- Headquarters: Steenokkerzeel, Belgium
- Number of locations: 7 (2015)
- Area served: Belgium and Luxembourg
- Services: Air traffic control
- Operating income: €310,412,000 (2022)
- Net income: €18,841,000 (2022)
- Number of employees: 933 (2022)
- Website: https://www.skeyes.be

skeyes, formerly called Belgocontrol or in its complete form the Authority of airways (French: Régie des voies aériennes, Dutch: Regie der Luchtwegen), is the Belgian air navigation and traffic service provider for the civil airspace for which the Belgian State is responsible. It was created in 1998.

skeyes is a member of the Civil Air Navigation Services Organisation (CANSO), and is integrated into the Functional Airspace Block Europe Central (FABEC).

== Zones of activities ==
In Belgium, its zones of activities extend up to flight level 245 (24,500 feet (7.5 km; 4.64 mi)), including the control of the airports of Brussels, Charleroi, Liege, Antwerp and Ostend. In the Grand Duchy of Luxembourg, they apply between flight levels 145 or 165 up to flight level 245.

The sectors above flight level 245 fall within the competence of the Eurocontrol centre in Maastricht, to which Belgium has delegated air traffic control for its upper airspace.

== Locations ==
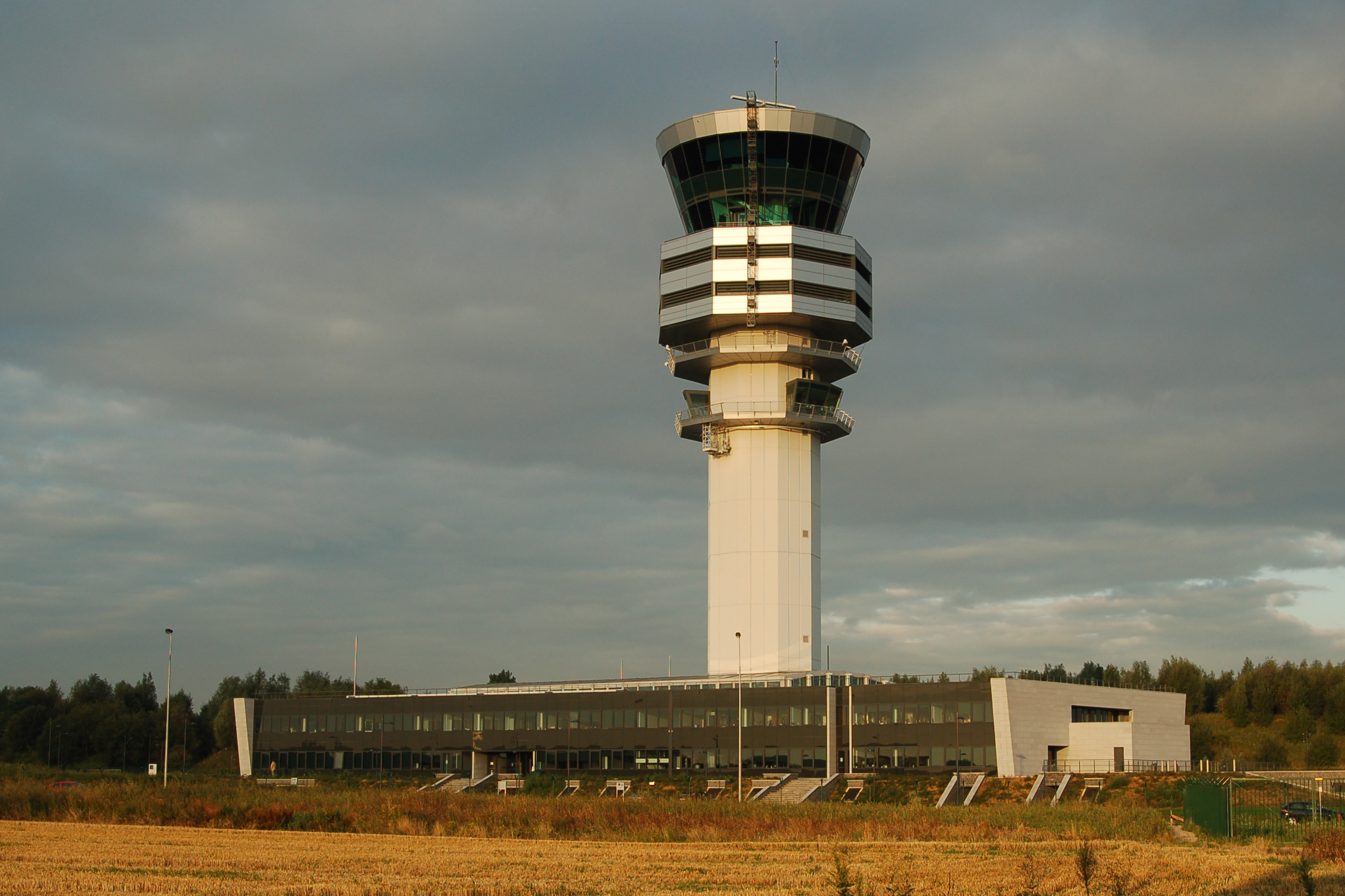
Control tower of Brussels Airport (EBBR), in Steenokkerzeel.

skeyes has seven sites, located in Belgium. Five of them include the control towers of the Belgian international airports, and two are radar stations:

- Steenokkerzeel: main operating office, including CANAC (Computer Assisted National Air traffic control Center) and control tower for Brussels airport;
- Charleroi: control tower for Brussels South Charleroi Airport;
- Bierset: control tower for Liege Airport;
- Deurne: control tower for Antwerp International Airport;
- Ostend: control tower for Ostend–Bruges International Airport;
- Bertem: radar station;
- Saint-Hubert: radar station.

== Legal status ==
skeyes is an autonomous public company, governed by the law of 21 March 1991. This law, in its Title VI, defines its mission as follows:

1. to ensure the safety of air navigation in the airspace for which the Belgian State is responsible [...];
2. to ensure to the Brussels airport the control of the movements of aircraft during approach, landing, take-off and taxi, and to continue to ensure the safety of the air traffic of public regional airports and aerodromes [...];
3. to provide police, airport and aeronautical investigation services with information relative to aircraft, their flying, their movements and the observable effects of those;
4. to provide meteorological information for air navigation, as well as telecommunication services or other services [...].

Since November 2018 Belgocontrol has used the trade name skeyes.
