= MRDC =

MRDC may refer to:

- Midwestern Robotics Design Competition - an annual robotics competition
- Mineral Resources Development Company - an investment management company
- U.S. Army Medical Research and Development Command
