= AAPA =

AAPA may stand for:

- Aboriginal Areas Protection Authority, in Northern Territory, Australia
- American Academy of Physician Associates
- American Association of Physical Anthropologists, now American Association of Biological Anthropologists
- American Association of Port Authorities, a trade association
- American Association of Public Accountants, now American Institute of Certified Public Accountants
- Asian American Political Alliance, a political organization in the 1960s
- Association Against the Prohibition Amendment, in the US in the 1920s
- Association of Asia Pacific Airlines, a trade association
- Association of Authorised Public Accountants, a British professional body
- Australian Aboriginal Progressive Association, an early Aboriginal advocacy body
- Australian Airline Pilot Academy, at Wagga Wagga Airport, Australia

== See also ==
- Aapa moors or aapa mires, types of string bog
