= Nascotours S.A.E =

Travel and tourism company in Egypt

NASCO Tours S.A.E
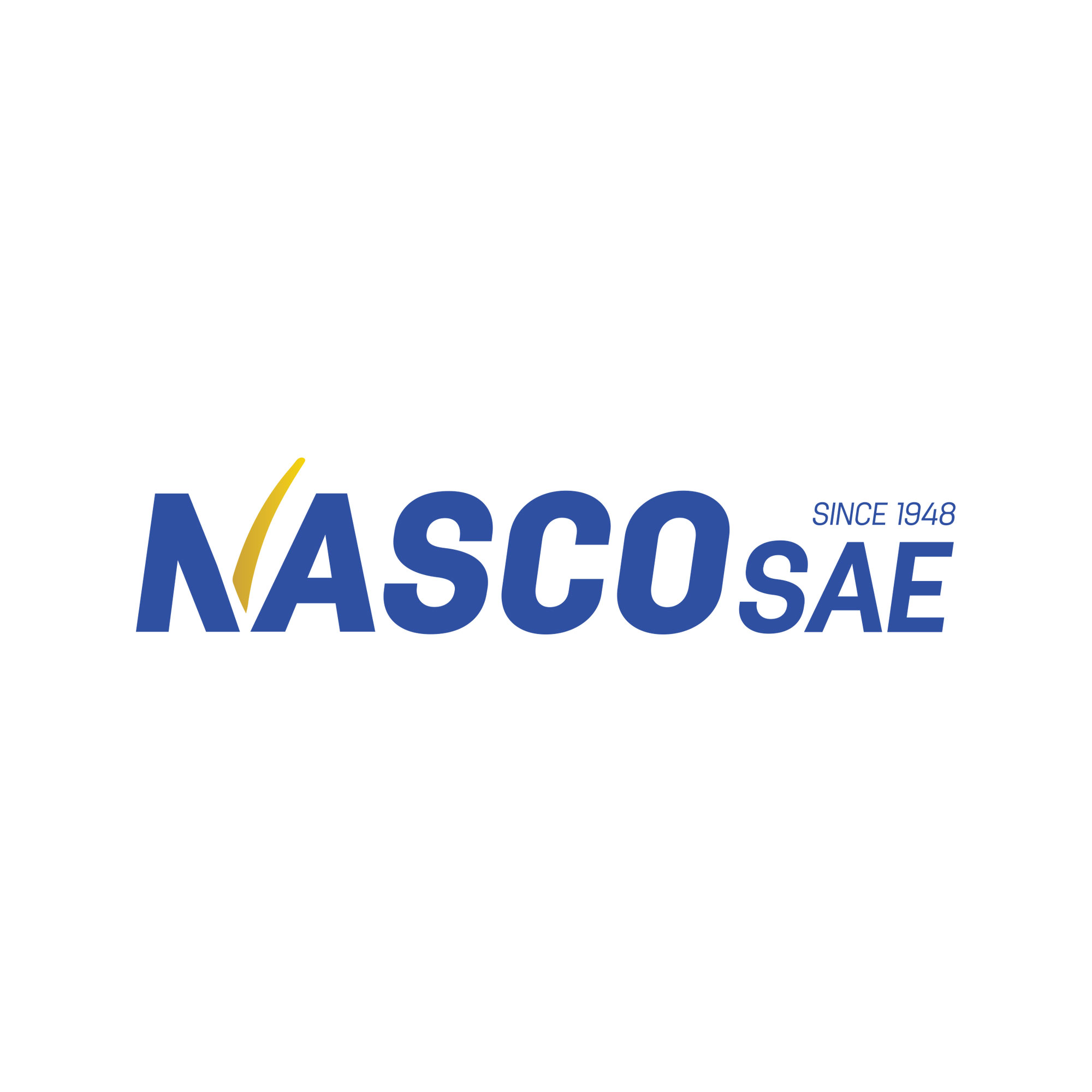
- Industry: Travel and Tourism
- Founded: 1948
- Headquarters: 63, Nebi Daniel, Alexandria, Egypt
- Products: Travel Agency, Transportation Services, Yachting Services
- Owner: Machi Gavalas CEO
- Website: www.nasco-sae.com

NASCO Tours S.A.E is a shipping, travel, and tourism company in Egypt. The company is one of the largest travel and tourism companies in Egypt. It also provides transport ranging from land travel to air travel, and works as a yachting agent to facilitate and manage luxury yachts crossing through Egypt.

== History ==
NASCO SAE was founded in 1948.
