= JSDC =

JSDC may refer to:

- Jerry Sanders Creative Design Competition.
- Joint Service Defence College.
- Journal of the Society of Dyers and Colourists, a journal relaunched in 2001 as Coloration Technology by the Society of Dyers and Colourists, Bradford, UK.
