= Ganja Pass =

Border corridor between Azerbaijan and Georgia

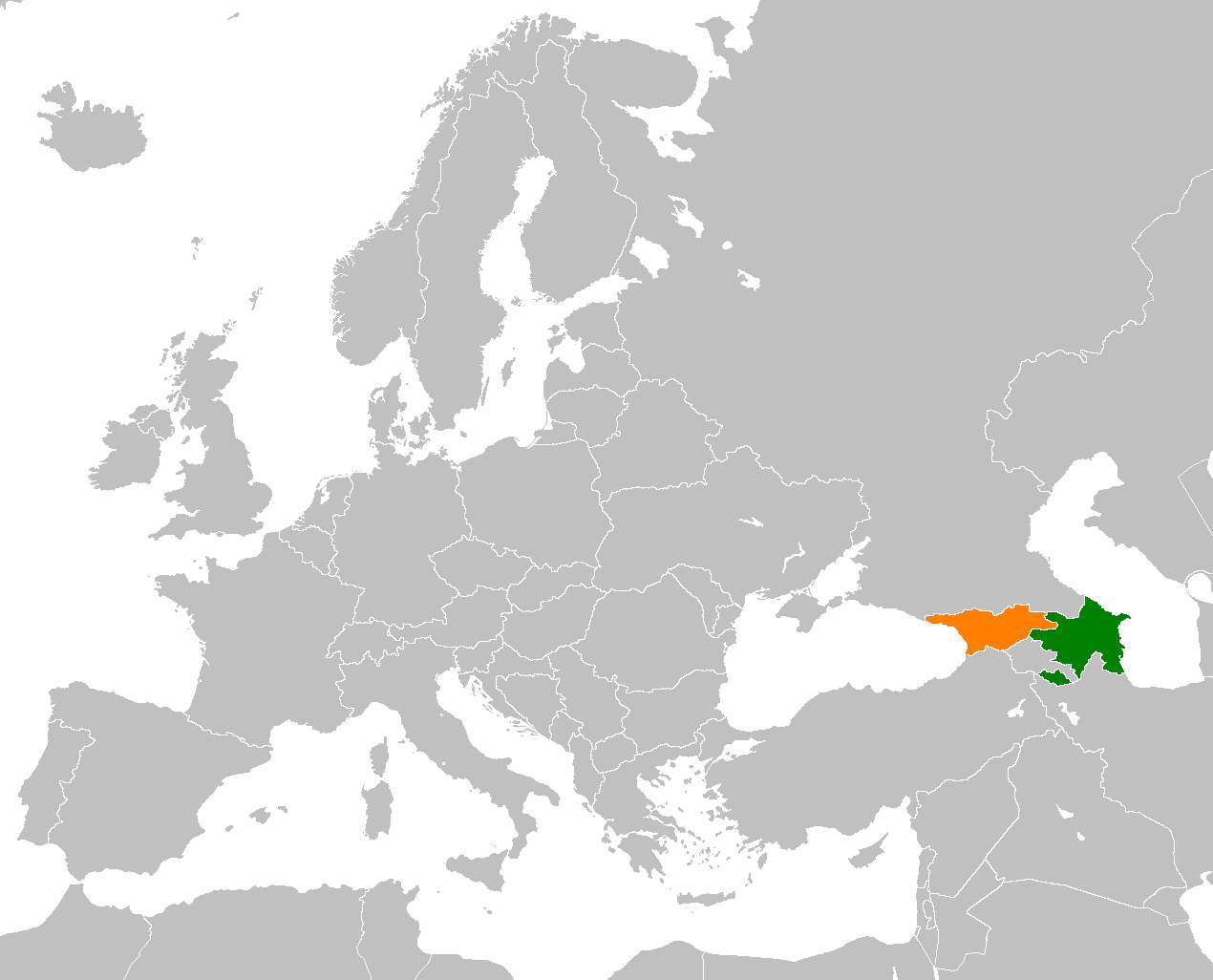
Azerbaijan (green) and Georgia (orange) on the regional map

Ganja Gap (also known as the Ganja Pass or the Ganja Corridor) is a narrow border corridor connecting Azerbaijan and Georgia. It serves as a strategic transit route linking Europe and Asia without passing through Iran or Russia. The corridor is named after Ganja, the second-largest city in Azerbaijan, located nearby.

The corridor extends westward toward Turkey, the Black Sea region, and broader Europe, and eastward toward Central Asia and China.

== Transport and infrastructure ==
The Ganja Gap includes major automobile and railway routes forming part of transcontinental freight connections. It is also associated with fiber-optic infrastructure linking Western Europe and the Caspian region.

In addition to transport infrastructure, the corridor provides access to major energy export routes, facilitating landlocked Azerbaijan’s access to global markets. Oil and gas pipelines passing through or near the region include the Baku–Tbilisi–Ceyhan, the Baku–Supsa, and the Southern Gas Corridor.

== Geopolitical significance ==
Since the start of the Russian invasion of Ukraine in 2022, the corridor has gained renewed geopolitical attention. According to The Diplomat, it has been discussed by Western policymakers as an alternative route for transporting Kazakh oil that bypasses Russia. During the War in Afghanistan, the United States used routes through the South Caucasus and the Caspian Sea to transport goods to Central Asia.

== Airspace and aviation ==
In addition to ground and energy transit, the Ganja Gap forms part of a narrow air corridor in the South Caucasus used by airlines operating between Europe and Asia. The corridor lies between Russian airspace to the north and Iranian airspace to the south. After Western carriers were barred from Russian airspace in 2022 following the Russian invasion of Ukraine, the South Caucasus assumed increased importance as an alternative routing zone.

During periods of airspace closure in the Middle East, including over Iran, Iraq, Israel, and Jordan, airlines have diverted flights through the South Caucasus and Central Asia. In June 2025, approximately 1,800 flights were reportedly affected in a single day due to regional closures, leading to increased traffic over Azerbaijan, Georgia, and Armenia.

The Civil Air Navigation Services Organisation (CANSO) reported that Azerbaijan handled more than 100 additional flights per day during temporary Iranian airspace closures in 2025. According to reporting in The Telegraph, by early 2026 as many as 1,000 flights per day were passing through the Azerbaijani air corridor linking Europe and East Asia. The corridor has been described as approximately 85 miles (137 km) wide at its narrowest point, situated between Russian and Iranian airspace.

Data published by the Civil Air Navigation Services Organisation (CANSO) indicated that traffic volumes in Azerbaijani airspace increased significantly between 2023 and 2025, rising from 78,100 flights in the first half of 2023 to 125,600 in the same period of 2025. The number of transit passengers at Heydar Aliyev International Airport in Baku also increased during this period. Most international air traffic control bodies have generally regarded the corridor as operationally safe, though some governments have issued advisories citing potential regional security risks due to proximity to areas of military activity. Aviation risk analysts have noted that a closure of Azerbaijani airspace would significantly disrupt east–west traffic flows, potentially forcing airlines to adopt longer southern routings via the Arabian Peninsula or, in some cases, polar routes, increasing flight times and operational costs.
