= Civil Air Navigation Services Organisation =

- Abbreviation: CANSO
- Type: International
- Headquarters: Soesterberg, Netherlands
- Director General: Simon Hocquard
- Website: www.canso.org

The Civil Air Navigation Services Organisation (CANSO) is a representative body of companies that provide air traffic control. It represents the interests of air navigation service providers (ANSPs). CANSO members are responsible for supporting over 85% of world air traffic, and through its workgroups, members share information and develop new policies, with the aim of improving air navigation services on the ground and in the air. CANSO also represents its members' views in regulatory and industry forums, including at the International Civil Aviation Organization (ICAO), where it has official observer status.

Full membership is open to all ANSPs regardless of their legal status. This includes ANSPs who are integrated within government structures and departments. Members who are not separated from their governments are able to sign an article of membership which explicitly recognises that CANSO does not represent the national government of the ANSP's home state in any way.

The associate membership of CANSO is drawn from companies and organisations from the aviation industry who are involved with the delivery of air traffic services. Membership offers them the chance to network both formally and informally with clients, and decision makers across the aviation industry. Associate members may contribute to CANSO's work programmes and help it improve the delivery of air navigation services.

CANSO is member of the Air Transport Action Group (ATAG).

== Full members ==
Full members of CANSO
Name	Country	Website	CANSO
Aeronautical Radio of Thailand (AEROTHAI)	Thailand	www.aerothai.co.th	
Aeroportos de Moçambique, E.P. (ADM)	Mozambique	www.aeroportos.co.mz	
Air Navigation & Weather Services, CAA (ANWS)	Taiwan	www.anws.gov.tw	
Air Navigation Services of the Czech Republic (ANS Czech Republic)	Czech Republic	www.ans.cz	
Air Traffic Management Bureau (ATMB)	China	www.atmb.net.cn	
Air Traffic & Navigation Services (ATNS)	South Africa	www.atns.com	
National Air Navigation Services Company (NANSC)	Egypt	www.nansceg.net	
Airport & Aviation Services (S.L.) Limited (AASL)	Sri Lanka	www.airport.lk	
Airports Authority of India (AAI)	India	www.aai.aero	
Airports Fiji Limited (AFL)	Fiji	www.airports.fiji.com	
Airservices Australia	Australia	www.airservicesaustralia.com	
Airways New Zealand	New Zealand	www.airways.co.nz	
AirNav Indonesia	Indonesia	www.airnavindonesia.co.id	
Austro Control	Austria	www.austrocontrol.at	
Avinor AS	Norway	www.avinor.no	
AZANS Azerbaijan (Azerbaijan Air Navigation Services)	Azerbaijan		
Skeyes	Belgium	www.skeyes.be	
Bulgarian Air Traffic Services Authority (BULATSA)	Bulgaria	www.bulatsa.com	
CAA Uganda (Civil Aviation Authority of Uganda)	Uganda	www.caa.co.ug	
Civil Aviation Authority of Bangladesh (CAAB)	Bangladesh	www.caab.gov.bd	
Civil Aviation Authority of Singapore (CAAS)	Singapore	www.caas.gov.sg	
Civil Aviation Regulatory Commission (CARC)	Jordan	www.carc.gov.jo	
Department of Airspace Control (DECEA)	Brazil	www.decea.gov.br	
Department of Civil Aviation, Republic of Cyprus	Cyprus	www.mcw.gov.cy/dca	
DFS Deutsche Flugsicherung GmbH	Germany	www.dfs.de	
Dirección General de Control de Tránsito Aéreo (DGCTA)	Argentina		
Direction des Services de la navigation aérienne (DSNA)	France	www.developpement-durable.gouv.fr	
Dutch Caribbean Air Navigation Service Provider (DC-ANSP)	Curaçao	dc-ansp.org	
Empresa Argentina de Navegación Aérea (EANA)	Argentina	www.eana.com.ar	
ENAIRE	Spain	www.enaire.es	
ENANA-EP (Empresa Nacional de Exploração de Aeroportos e Navegação Aérea)	Angola	www.enana.co.ao	
ENAV S.p.A. (Ente Nazionale di Assistenza al Volo)	Italy	www.enav.it	
Estonian Air Navigation Services (EANS)	Estonia	www.eans.ee	
Federal Aviation Administration (FAA)	United States	www.faa.gov	
Fintraffic	Finland	www.fintraffic.fi	
GCAA United Arab Emirates (General Civil Aviation Authority)	United Arab Emirates	www.gcaa.gov.ae	
Hellenic Civil Aviation Authority (HCAA)	Greece	www.hcaa.gr	
HungaroControl Pte. Ltd. Co.	Hungary	www.hungarocontrol.hu	
Iran Airports Co. (IAC)	Iran	www.airport.ir	
AirNav Ireland (ANI)	Ireland	www.airnav.ie	
ISAVIA Ltd.	Iceland	www.isavia.is	
Israel Airports Authority	Israel	www.iaa.gov.il	
Japan Air Navigation Service	Japan	www.mlit.go.jp/en/koku/	
Kazaeronavigatsia	Kazakhstan	www.ans.kz	
Kenya Civil Aviation Authority	Kenya	www.kcaa.or.ke	
Latvijas Gaisa Satiksme (LGS)	Latvia	www.lgs.lv	
Letové prevádzkové služby (LPS SR, š. p.)	Slovak Republic	www.lps.sk	
LFV (Luftfartsverket)	Sweden	www.lfv.se	
Luchtverkeersleiding Nederland (LVNL)	Netherlands	www.lvnl.nl	
Luxembourg ANA	Luxembourg	www.ana.public.lu	
Maldives Airports Company Limited (MACL)	Maldives	www.macl.aero	
Malta Air Traffic Services (MATS)	Malta	www.maltats.com	
Moldovian Air Traffic Services Authority (S.E. MoldATSA)	Moldova	www.moldatsa.md	
Albcontrol	Albania	www.albcontrol.al	
National Air Navigation Services Company (NANSC)	Egypt	www.nansceg.net	
National Airports Corporation Limited (NACL)	Zambia	www.nacl.co.zm	
NATS UK (National Air Traffic Services)	United Kingdom	www.nats.co.uk	
Nav Canada	Canada	www.navcanada.ca	
NAV Portugal (Navegação Aérea de Portugal)	Portugal	www.nav.pt	
Naviair	Denmark	www.naviair.dk	
Nigerian Airspace Management Agency (NAMA)	Nigeria	www.nama.gov.ng	
Office de l'Aviation Civile et des Aeroports (OACA)	Tunisia	www.oaca.nat.tn	
Oro Navigacija, Lithuania	Lithuania	www.ans.lt	
Niusky Pacific Limited (NSPL)	Papua New Guinea	www.niuskypacific.com.pg	
Polish Air Navigation Services Agency (PANSA)	Poland	www.pansa.pl	
Prishtina International Airport JSC	Kosovo	www.airportpristina.com	
ROMATSA (Romanian Air Traffic Services Administration)	Romania	www.romatsa.ro	
Sakaeronavigatsia Ltd.	Georgia	www.airnav.ge	
Saudi Air Navigation Services (SANS)	Saudi Arabia	www.sans.com.sa	
SENEAM (Servicios a la Navegacion en el Espacio Aereo Mexicano)	Mexico	www.seneam.gob.mx	
Serbia and Montenegro Air Traffic Services Agency (SMATSA)	Serbia and Montenegro	www.smatsa.rs	
Serco	United Kingdom	www.serco.com	
skyguide	Switzerland	www.skyguide.ch	
Slovenia Control	Slovenia	www.sloveniacontrol.si	
State Airports Authority & ANSP (DHMI, Devlet Hava Meydanları İşletmesi)	Turkey	www.dhmi.gov.tr	
State ATM Corporation	Russian Federation	www.gkovd.ru	
Tanzania Civil Aviation Authority	Tanzania	www.tcaa.go.tz	
Ukrainian State Air Traffic Service Enterprise (UkSATSE)	Ukraine	uksatse.ua	
US DoD Policy Board on Federal Aviation	United States		
Viet Nam Air Traffic Management Corporation (VATM)	Viet Nam	https://vatm.vn	

== See also ==
- List of air navigation service providers
