= ATAG =

ATAG may refer to:

- Air Transport Action Group
- Authoring Tools Accessibility Guidelines (ATAG), a part of the Web Accessibility Initiative (WAI)
