= Asia Pacific Airlines =

Asia Pacific Airlines may refer to:

- Asia Pacific Airlines (Guam), a cargo airline with its corporate headquarters in California and its flight operations based in Guam.
- Asia Pacific Airlines (PNG), a passenger airline based in Papua New Guinea.
- Association of Asia Pacific Airlines, a trade association of major Asia/Pacific airlines.
