= CANAC 2 =

Main Belgian air traffic control centre

- Computer Assisted National Air Traffic Control
- Location within Belgium

General information
- Type: Air traffic control centre
- Location: Steenokkerzeel, Belgium
- Coordinates: 50.904°N 4.5095°E
- Elevation: 20 m (66 ft)
- Current tenants: Belgian ATC staff
- Completed: 28 November 2009
- Inaugurated: 10 February 2010

Design and construction
- Main contractor: Thales ATM

CANAC 2 is the main Belgian air traffic control centre. It is a development of the previous CANAC building, and when it opened in 2009, it was one of the most advanced ATC centres in Europe.

== History ==
In the late 1980s (and throughout the 1990s) French air traffic controllers often went on strike, leaving flights to be unceremoniously diverted over the Netherlands and Belgium.

The CANAC building opened on 11 March 1993.

From 2 December 2009, military and civilian air traffic controllers worked side by side.

=== Construction ===
Planning for CANAC 2 began in September 2007. It was built by Thales of France, and opened on 28 November 2009. The official opening was on 10 February 2010. It cost 60 million euros.

== Structure ==
It has four circular sets of screens, ACC East, ACC West, APP and Military.

== Operation ==
It looks after the EDYY flight information region.

It watches up to 24,500 feet. It manages up to 600,000 aircraft movements a year. It works with the TopSky system (Thales), known as Eurocat-E before 2012.

== See also ==
- Centre en route de la navigation aérienne of the Direction des Services de la navigation aérienne (DSNA) of France and Luchtverkeersleiding Nederland of the Netherlands
