= Polish Airports =

Coordinates: 52°10′13″N 20°58′28″E

Polish Airports Polskie Porty Lotnicze
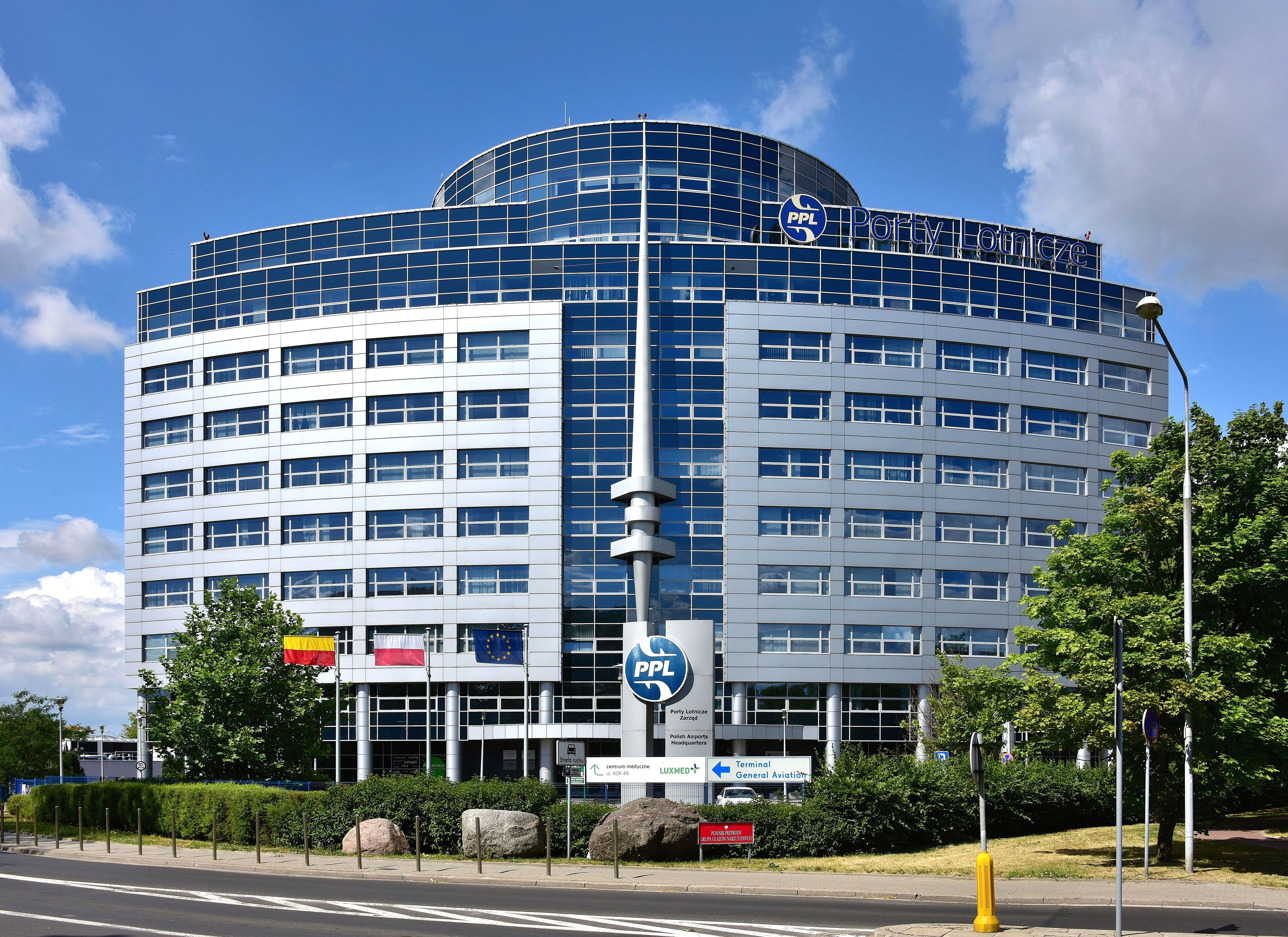
- Company type: Government-owned corporation
- Industry: Aviation
- Founded: October 23, 1987; 38 years ago
- Founder: Government of Poland
- Headquarters: 1 Żwirki i Wigury street, Warsaw, Poland
- Products: Airport management
- Owner: Centralny Port Komunikacyjny Sp. z o.o.
- Website: www.polish-airports.com

Polish Airports Joint Stock Company (Polish: Polskie Porty Lotnicze Spółka Akcyjna) is a Polish single-member joint-stock company of the State Treasury, and in the years 1987–2023 a state-owned enterprise engaged in the construction, modernization and operation of airports and ground aviation facilities, conducting, among others, ground handling of aircraft at Warsaw Chopin Airport. The company's headquarters is located at 1 Żwirki i Wigury street in Warsaw, and the management board is located at Komisji Obrony Robotników 49 street

== History ==
The enterprise was established on the basis of the Act of 23 October 1987. It continues the activity of the Air Traffic and Communication Airports Board existing since 1959. From October 2017 to October 2022, the company's activity was regulated by the Act of 15 September 2017 on the state-owned enterprise "Porty Lotnicze".

The company is the sole owner of the airports in Warsaw, Radom and Zielona Góra.

PPL holds shares in 10 companies supervising the operation of airports in Kraków, Szczecin, Rzeszów, Poznań, Nowy Dwór Mazowiecki (Warsaw Modlin Airport), Gdańsk, Wrocław, Katowice, Szymany (Olsztyn-Mazury Airport) and Bydgoszcz. In addition, PPL holds shares in handling companies and other entities. Since August 2018, it has also been the owner of the Warsaw Radom Airport.

On October 2, 2022, the Act of July 22, 2022 on streamlining the investment process of the Central Communication Port entered into force, pursuant to which the state-owned enterprise Porty Lotnicze was transformed as of April 1, 2023 into a single-member joint-stock company of the State Treasury operating under the name Polskie Porty Lotnicze Spółka Akcyjna. The transformation was related to the contribution of its shares in order to increase the share capital of Centralny Port Komunikacyjny sp. z o.o. in order to streamline the investment process leading to support and accelerate the implementation of the investment.

On September 22, 2023, based on the decision of the government plenipotentiary for CPK Marcin Horała, all 100% of the shares of Polskie Porty Lotnicze (PPL) owned by the State Treasury were acquired by Centralny Port Komunikacyjny (CPK) Sp. z o.o. and thus PPL became part of the CPK Capital Group.
