= Air travel =

Form of travel using aircraft to fly above ground for long distances

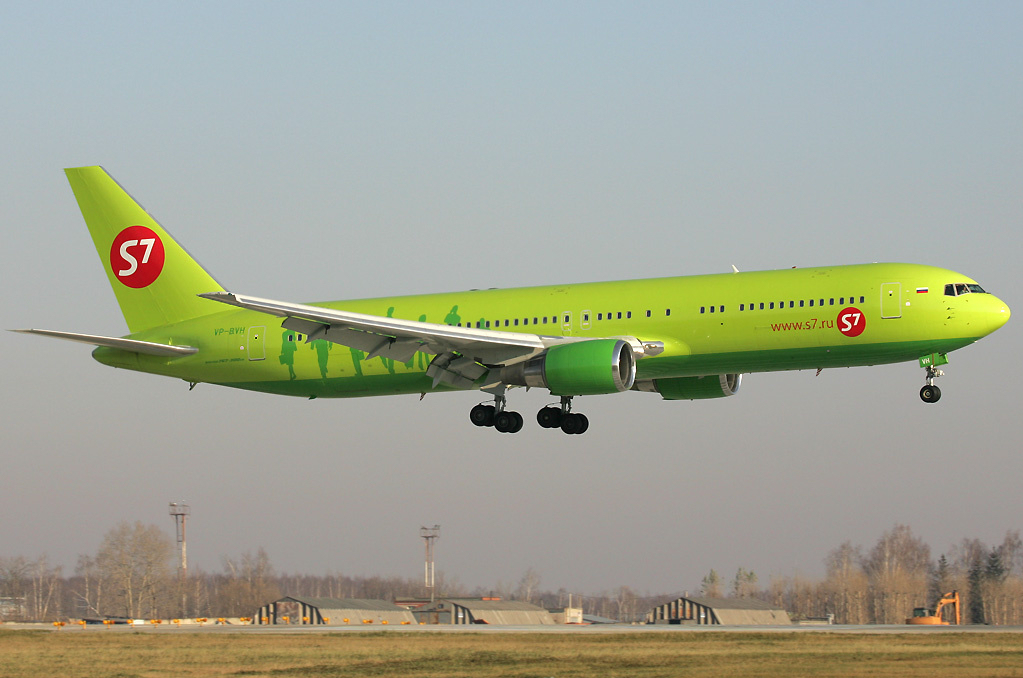
An S7 Airlines Boeing 767-300ER landing at Moscow Domodedovo Airport in November 2008

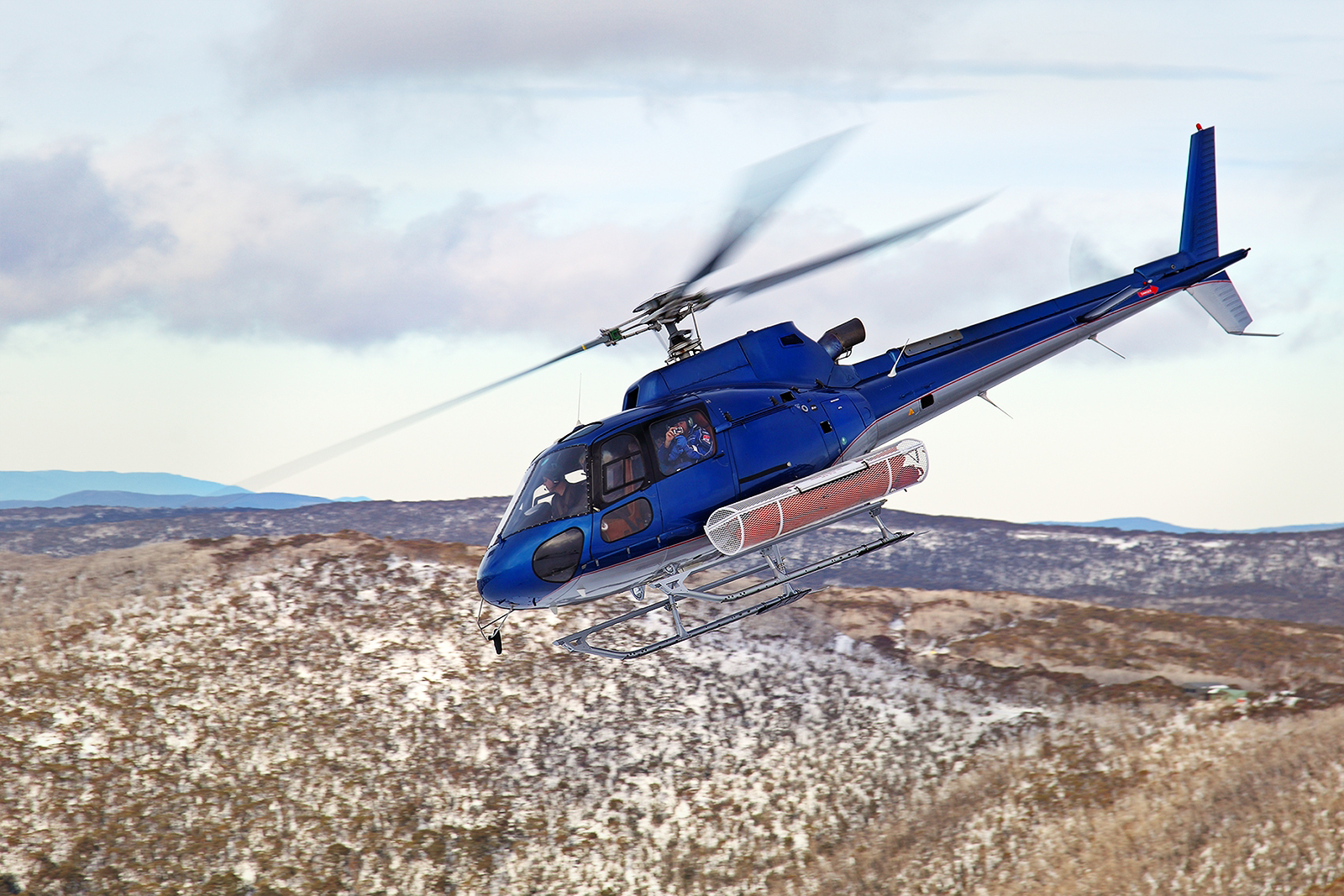
A Eurocopter AS350B helicopter in flight in February 2010

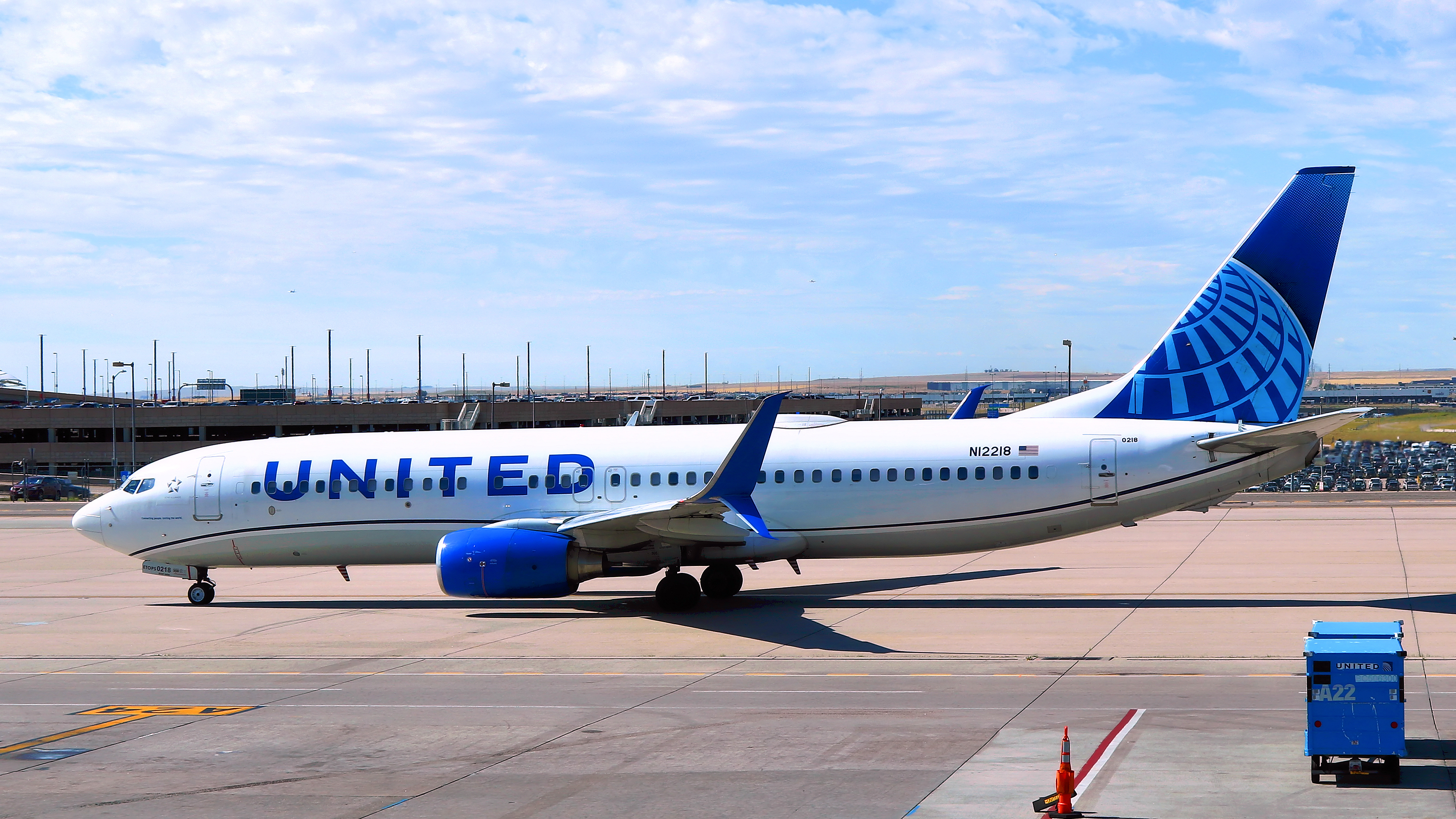
A United Airlines Boeing 737-800 taxiing on the tarmac at Denver International Airport in July 2024

Air travel is a form of travel in vehicles such as airplanes, jet aircraft, helicopters, hot air balloons, blimps, gliders, hang gliders, parachutes, or anything else that can sustain flight. Use of air travel began vastly increasing in the 1930s: the number of Americans flying went from about 6,000 in 1930 to 450,000 by 1934 and to 1.2 million by 1938. It has continued to greatly increase in recent decades, doubling worldwide between the mid-1980s and the year 2000. Modern air travel is much safer than road travel.

== Domestic and international flights ==
Air travel is separated into two general classifications: national/domestic and international flights. Flights from one point to another within the same country are domestic flights. Flights from a point in one country to a point within a different country are international flights. Travelers can use domestic or international flights in either private or public travel.

== Commercial air travel ==
Travel class on an airplane is usually split into a two, three or four class model service. U.S. domestic flights usually have two classes: economy class and a domestic first class partitioned into cabins. International flights may have up to four classes: economy class; premium economy; business class or club class; and first class.

Most air travel starts and ends at a commercial airport. The typical procedure is check-in; border control; airport security baggage and passenger check before entering the gate; boarding; flying; and pick-up of luggage and – limited to international flights – another border control at the host country's border. Most passengers must go through these steps when flying with a commercial airline.

For longer journeys, air travel may consist of several flights with a layover in between. The number of layovers often depends on the number of hub airports the journey is routed through.

Airlines rely either on the point-to-point model or the spoke-and-hub model to operate flights in between airports. The point-to-point model, often used by low-cost carriers such as Southwest, relies on scheduling flights directly between destination airports. The spoke-and-hub model, used by carriers such as American and Delta, as well as international airlines like Emirates and Qatar Airways, relies on scheduling flights to and from major global hub airports. The hub-and-spoke model allows airlines to connect more destinations and provide more frequent routes, while the point-to-point system allows airlines to avoid layovers and have more cost effective operations.

== Environmental effects ==
Modern aircraft consume less fuel per person and mile traveled than cars when fully booked. However, the distances traveled are often significantly larger and will not replace car travel but instead add to it, and not every flight is booked out.

Instead, the scheduled flights are predominant, resulting in a far worse fuel efficiency. According to the ATAG, flights produced 781 million tonnes (769 million long tons) of the greenhouse gas CO_{2} in 2015 globally, as compared to an estimated total of 36 billion tonnes (35 billion long tons) anthropogenic CO_{2}. Carbon offset is often proposed as solution to mitigate the CO_{2} emissions of flying. There are many NGOs that offer to compensate CO_{2} emissions by advancing clean renewable energy, reducing energy consumption and capturing already released carbon in trees or other plants. However, carbon offsetting is a very controversial topic as it only tries to mitigate what has already been emitted.

== Safety ==
Modern air travel is significantly safer than road travel. In 2008 in the United States, there were 1.27 fatalities per 100 million road vehicle miles, compared to no fatalities and almost zero accidents per million flying miles. There were more than five million driving accidents, compared to 20 accidents in flying. Travelers may perceive planes to be more dangerous as they do not allow individual control and because plane crashes are more catastrophic events (the availability bias).

== Health effects ==
Deep vein thrombosis (DVT) is the third-most common vascular disease, next to stroke and heart attack. It is estimated that DVT affects one in 5,000 travelers on long flights. Risk increases with exposure to more flights within a short time frame and with increasing duration of flights.

During flight, the aircraft cabin pressure is usually maintained at the equivalent of 6,000–8,000 ft (1,800–2,400 m) above sea level. Most healthy travelers will not notice any effects. However, for travelers with cardiopulmonary diseases (especially those who normally require supplemental oxygen), cerebrovascular disease, anemia, or sickle cell disease, conditions in an aircraft can exacerbate underlying medical conditions. Aircraft cabin air is typically dry, usually 10%–20% humidity, which can cause dryness of the mucous membranes of the eyes and airways.

== See also ==
- Aviation accidents and incidents
- Aviation safety
- Commercial aviation
- Environmental impact of aviation
- Frequent-flyer program
- History of aviation
- Hypermobility
- List of passenger airlines
- Punctuality
- Travel document
