= EDTF =

EDTF may refer to:

- e-Learning Developers’ Task Force, predecessor of E-Learning Developers' Community of Practice (ELCoP)
- EVA Development Flight Tests (EDTF-5), of STS-80
- Exam Development Task Forces, of the American Registry for Diagnostic Medical Sonography
- Extended Date Time Format, a type of extended date formats added to ISO 8601 in 2019
- Freiburg Airport, Baden-Württemberg, Germany
