= Radom Air Show =

Biannual Airshow in Poland

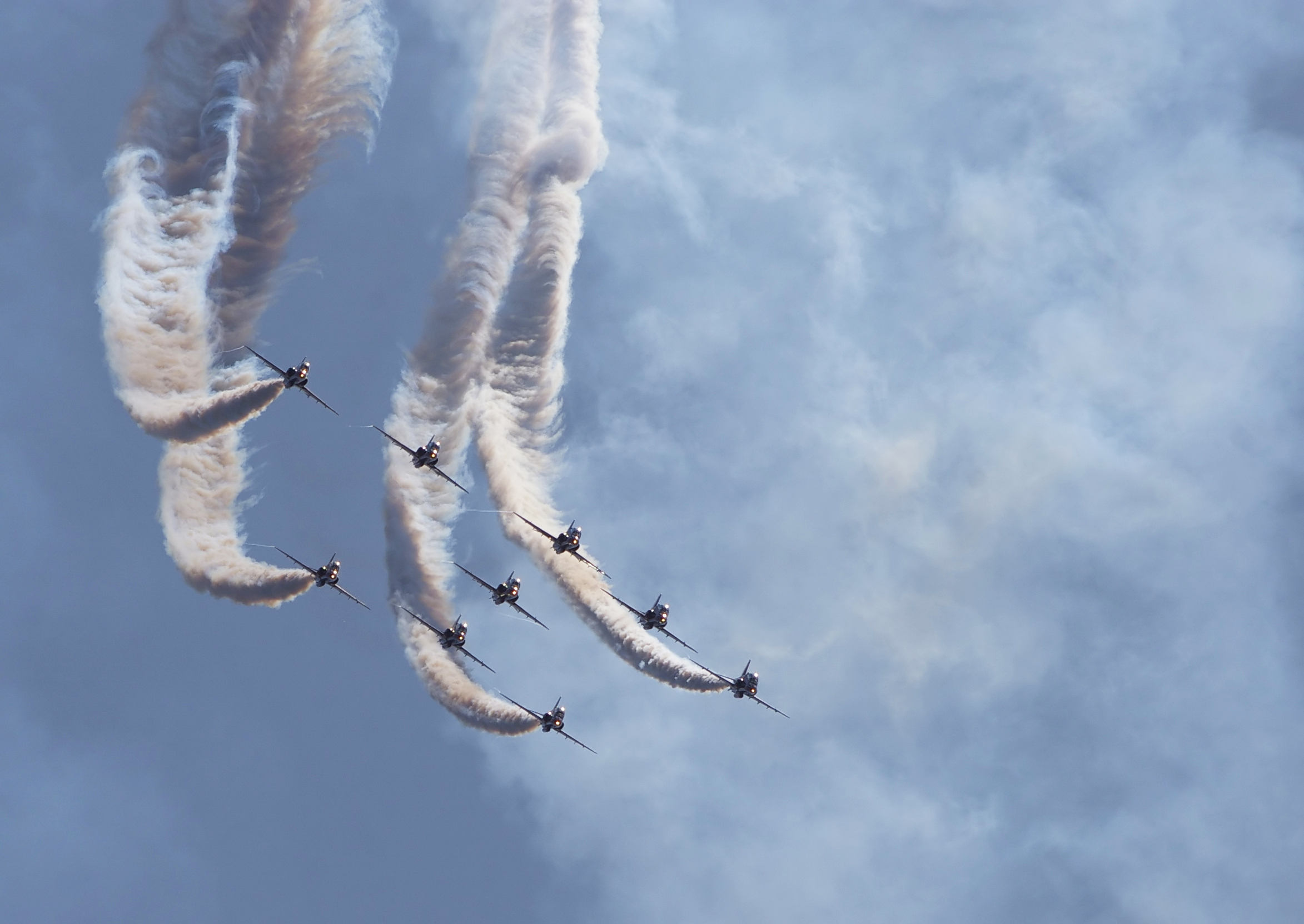
- The Red Arrows performing at Radom Air Show 2005
- Genre: Air show
- Dates: August
- Frequency: Biennial: Odd years
- Venue: Warsaw Radom Airport
- Location: Radom
- Country: Poland
- Established: 2000; 26 years ago
- Most recent: 2025
- Next event: 2026
- Organizer: Armed Forces General Command, Ministry of National Defence
- Website: airshowradom.pl/

The Radom Air Show (Polish: Międzynarodowe Pokazy Lotnicze „Air Show Radom“, International air shows – Radom Air Show) is a biannual celebration in the city of Radom, Poland, which began in 2000 (to continue in 2001, 2002, 2003 and then 2005). Every other year during the last weekend of August, military planes from the air forces of Europe and Russia gather in Radom for the show, which entertains visitors through elaborate stunts and performances from the aircraft. According to the authorities behind the show, its aim is to entertain the citizens of Radom and all of Poland, as well as to bring much needed investors to the city.

Since its founding, the Radom Air Show has become the most popular air show in Poland.

== Accidents ==
=== 2007 AZL Żelazny mid-air collision ===
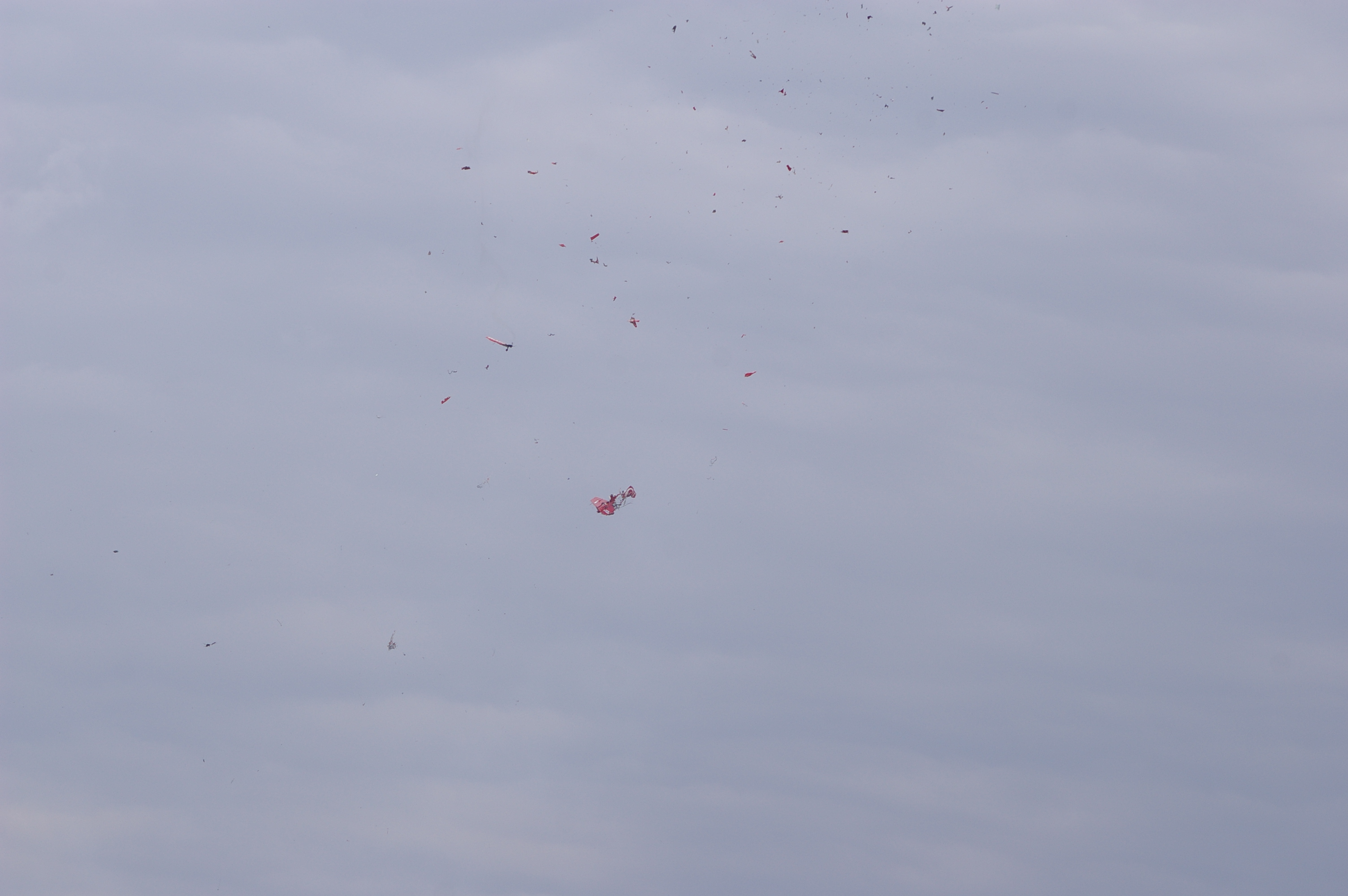
One of the aircraft falls to the ground seconds after the mid-air collision in 2007

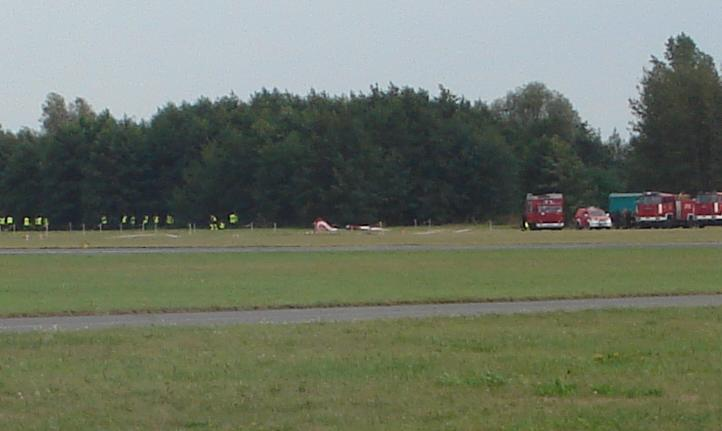
2007. One of the aircraft has just fallen to the ground after the collision.

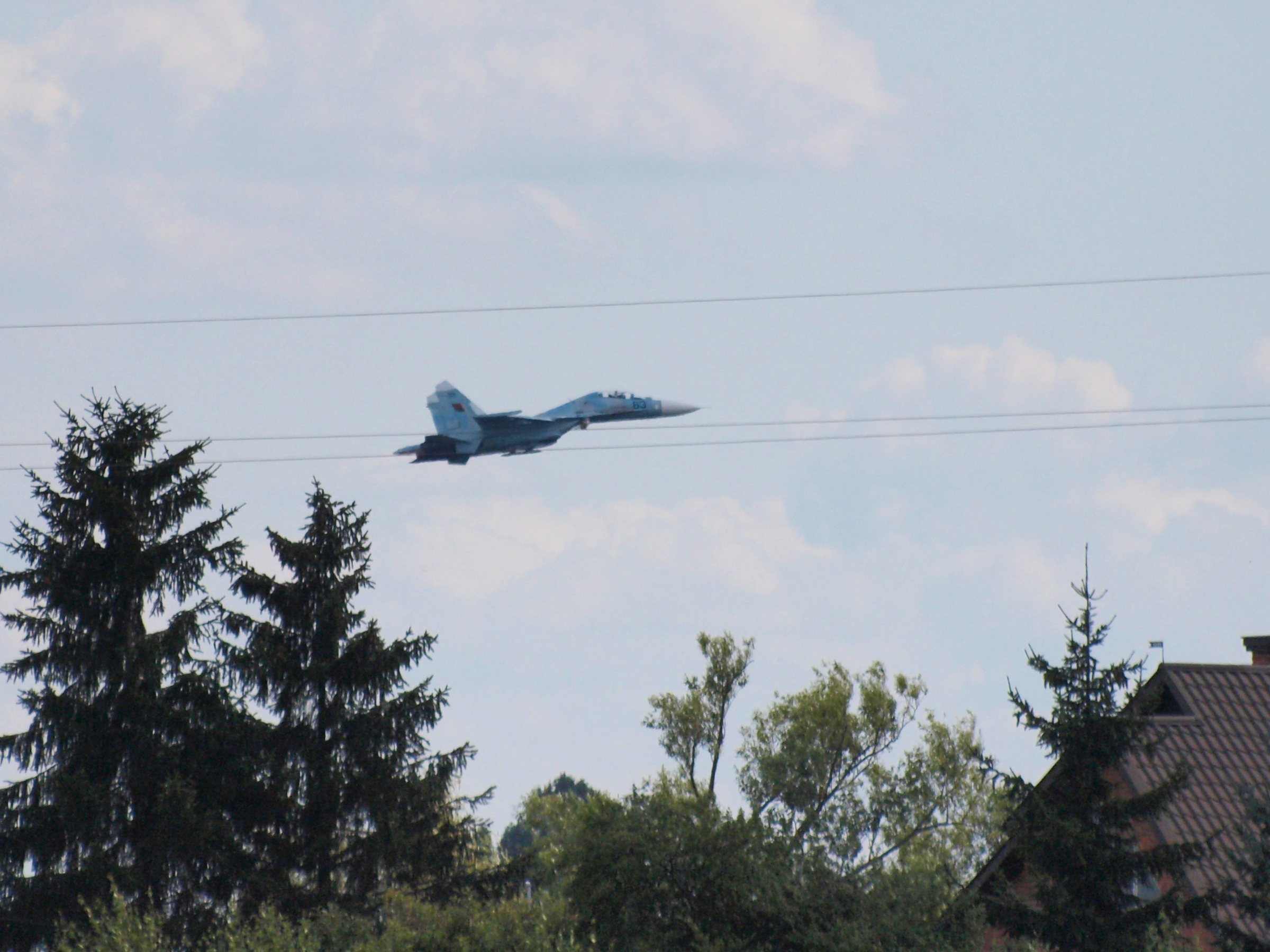
2009. Belarusian Air Force's Su-27UBM seconds before it crashes

On 1 September 2007, three Zlin Z-526 aircraft from the AZL Żelazny aerobatics team were performing their display. One maneuver involved the three aircraft simultaneously flying toward a central point from different directions. Two of the aircraft, one piloted by Piotr Banachowicz and the other by the group's founder, Lech Marchelewski, struck each other at right angles, destroying both aircraft and killing both pilots.

=== 2009 Belarusian Su-27 crash ===
On 30 August 2009, a Belarusian Sukhoi Su-27UBM (Number black 63) crashed while performing at the Radom show.

=== 2025 Polish F-16 crash ===
On 28 August 2025, a Polish Air Force F-16 fighter jet (Registration number 4056) crashed during a rehearsal for the air show. The aircraft impacted the runway around 17:30 UTC, damaging the surface, and the pilot, Major Maciej Krakowian, was killed in the accident. The weekend's Radom Air Show was subsequently cancelled.
