= Chicago Engineering Design Team =

University of Illinois Chicago robotics team

Chicago Engineering Design Team (EDT) is an interdisciplinary engineering and robotics organization made up of students from the University of Illinois Chicago (UIC). It was founded in 2000 by a small group of students that wanted to use the knowledge attained in the classroom in the field of theoretical and applied robotics. EDT is divided into three major teams, electrical, software, and mechanical, that aim to bring robotic engineering to the next level. The organization participates in robotics competitions, organizes various engineering events at UIC, and promotes Science, Technology, Engineering, and Mathematics (STEM) to the community through outreach events.

== Competitions ==
Chicago EDT competes in three major robotics competitions, the Intelligent Ground Vehicle Competition (IGVC), the NASA Robotic Mining Competition (RMC), and the Midwestern Robotics Design Competition (MRDC). IGVC is an international contest in which teams from different universities build robots that can autonomously navigate an obstacle course. Each team requires expertise in electrical, software, and mechanical engineering. RMC is a competition in which teams are tasked to design and construct an excavation robot to collect "lunar dust." Teams are given the option of manual control or autonomy. MRDC is a competition where teams of engineering students must build a robot which completes objectives in order to score points. This competition also has significant combat between robots, and it requires strategy and skill, in addition to a good design, in order to be successful.

In preparation for MRDC in March, teams begin the design process in the fall prior to competition. Construction of the robots can begin any time, but usually begin January before the competition. A UIC senior on the team noted that the team members were, "putting in over 20 hours a week," in addition to schoolwork.

== Robots ==
The team has developed and competed with the following robots:

Retired

- Achilles
- Ares
- Enyo
- Kratos
- Kronos
- Loki
- Odin
- Bob
- Scarab
- Thor
- Lamashtu

Active

- Scipio
- Richard
- GlaDOS
- Hushpuppy
- Pandora

== Notable Achievements ==
Chicago EDT has received a reputation for well-built robots. Some of their achievements are:

- 2002 Fourth place overall at the JSDC
- 2004 Participation in the JSDC
- 2005 Most Creative award at the JSDC for the robot Ares
- 2006 First place overall at the JSDC for the robot Ares
- 2006 Most Innovative award at the JSDC for the robot Thor for being the only autonomous robot to score points
- 2007 Third place overall at the JSDC for the robot Thor
- 2007 Fourth place overall at the JSDC for the robot Ares
- 2007 Second place in design competition at the IGVC for the robot Achilles
- 2008 First place overall at the JSDC for the robot Ares
- 2008 Fourth place overall at the JSDC for the robot Thor
- 2009 Second place overall at the JSDC for the robot Kronos
- 2009 Winner of the demolition round at the JSDC for the robot Odin
- 2012 First and second-place winner for Sephiroth and Raijin, respectively, and demolition champion for Raijin at JSDC
- 2013 First place winner, team Thanatos. Demolition winner team Lamashtu.
- 2014

JSDC:

First Place Winner, Team Richard - Awarded "Most Single Round Points Score"
Third Place Winner, Team GlaDos - Awarded "Most Minimalist"

RMC:

First Time Competitor, 17th out of 36

IGVC:

2nd Place in design

- 2019 Second place overall at MRDC for the robot Stella
