= Austro Control =

Austro Control (German: Österreichische Gesellschaft für Zivilluftfahrt) is the air navigation services provider that controls Austrian airspace. Its location and jurisdiction is Vienna, with the physical offices also being located in Vienna. Austro Control is a member of the Civil Air Navigation Services Organisation (CANSO).
