= Air Transport Action Group =

Coalition of aviation industry experts focusing on sustainable development issues

- Formation: 1990; 36 years ago
- Headquarters: Geneva, Switzerland
- Key people: Haldane Dodd (Executive Director)
- Website: www.ATAG.org

The Air Transport Action Group (ATAG) is a coalition of aviation industry experts focusing on sustainable development issues. Its board of directors is composed of senior representatives from trade associations like Airports Council International, Civil Air Navigation Services Organisation, International Air Transport Association, Airlines for America and Association of Asia Pacific Airlines, plus aircraft manufacturers and equipment suppliers like Airbus, ATR, Boeing, Bombardier Aerospace, CFM International, Embraer, Honeywell Aerospace, Pratt & Whitney, Rolls-Royce plc, Safran, and Thales Group.
