= E-Learning Developers' Community of Practice =

Logo

e-Learning Developers' Community of Practice (ElCoP) is practice developed following a decision of European air navigation service (ANS) training providers together with Eurocontrol, to create an e-learning developers community of practice in January 2009.

The aims of this community of practice are: to share knowledge and information on e-learning development matters between its members; to develop common deliverables; and to improve Eurocontrol deliverables, such as the best practice documentation for e-learning development and the digital learning asset sharing platform.

== History ==
Historically, ElCoP is the successor to the e-Learning Developers’ Task Force (EDTF), which was created in 2006 to develop a network of European e-learning developers involved in ANS training.

This group had the tasks of developing best practices in e-learning development and a platform which would enable users to share digital learning assets.

Even though EDTF finished these tasks in 2008, its members believed that there was added value in keeping a community of practice alive which would enable participants to learn from each other, to share best practices and to develop common deliverables. They suggested ElCoP.

ElCoP started work in the first quarter of 2009.

== Membership ==
Training providers that confirmed their participation are:

- AustroControl (Austria)
- Air Navigation Services of the Czech Republic (ANS CR) (Czech Republic)
- Deutsche Flugsicherung (DFS) (Germany)
- École Nationale de l'Aviation Civile (ENAC) (France)
- EUROCONTROL
- Hungarocontrol (Hungary)
- NAV Portugal (Portugal)
- Servicios y Estudios para la Navegación Aérea y la Seguridad Aeronáutica, S.A. (SENASA) (Spain)
- Skyguide (Switzerland)

== Work by ELCoP / EDTF ==
- Best practices and guidelines for e-learning developers in air traffic management
- Sea Patrol an educational technology game
