= PANSA =

Polish state agency for air traffic control

Polish Air Navigation Services Agency
- Polska Agencja Żeglugi Powietrznej
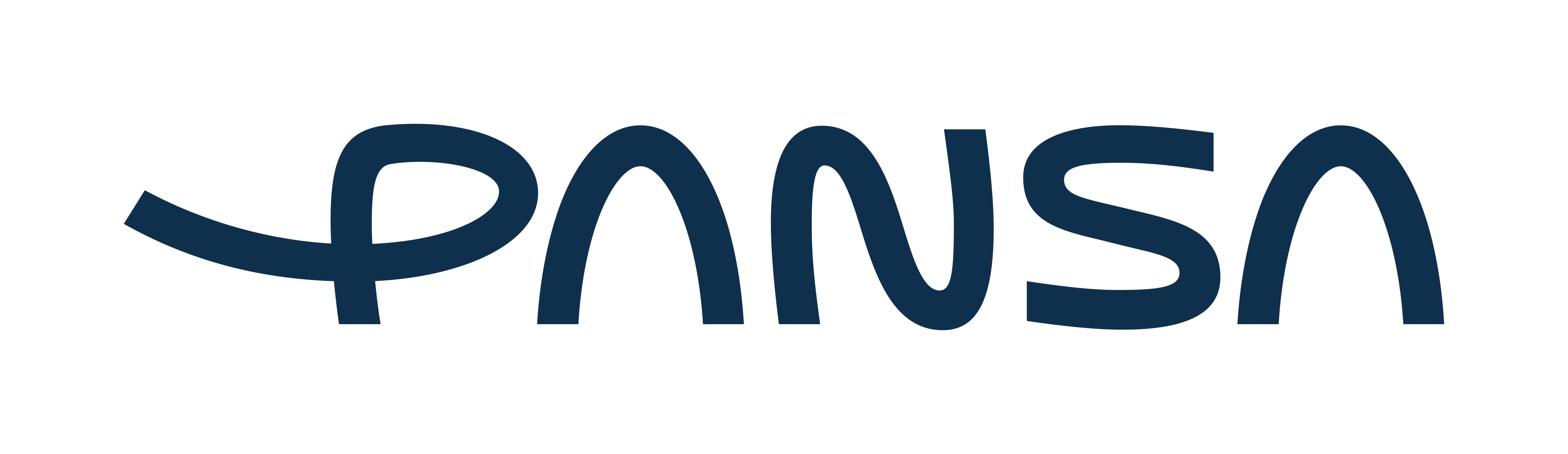

Agency overview
- Formed: April 1, 2007; 19 years ago
- Jurisdiction: FIR Warsaw
- Headquarters: Wieżowa 8, Warsaw; 52°09′44″N 20°57′34″E
- Parent agency: Ministry of Infrastructure
- Website: www.pansa.pl

The Polish Air Navigation Services Agency (Polish: Polska Agencja Żeglugi Powietrznej), known by its acronym PANSA or PAŻP, started its duty in 2007 as an independent unit, after splitting it from Polish Airports. It is running as a state agency which deals with air traffic management.

The main object for the Agency is to provide the safety for air traffic in FIR Warsaw. Additionally, the agency provides Flight Information Service (FIS) in uncontrolled airspace. It coordinates as well with Search and Rescue and provides an alerting service (ALRS).
