= Nigerian Airspace Management Agency =

Nigeria government agency

- Abbreviation: NAMA

Agency overview
- Formed: 1979

Jurisdictional structure
- Federal agency (Operations jurisdiction): Nigeria
- Operations jurisdiction: Nigeria
- Legal jurisdiction: Nigerian Airspace Management Agency
- Governing body: President of Nigeria
- Constituting instrument: It was established by Act of Parliament No. 48
- General nature: Federal law enforcement

Operational structure
- Headquarters: Plot 47, Kilometer 8, Umaru Yar' Adua Expressway, Airport Road ,Abuja
- Agency executive: Engr. Farouk Ahmed Umar, Managing Director/Chief Executive

Website
- http://nama.gov.ng/

Nigerian Airspace Management Agency the agency is a parastatal under the Federal Ministry of Aviation, responsible for regulating air travel and aviation services in Nigeria. Headquartered in Abuja, the agency oversees air navigation services within the Nigerian Flight Information Region. A part-time chairman, appointed by the President and Commander-in-Chief of the Armed Forces, leads the governing board for a four-year term.

The head office is in Abuja.

== History ==
The agency is a parastatal under the Federal Ministry of Aviation and Aerospace, responsible for regulating air travel and aviation services in Nigeria. It was established by Act of Parliament No. 48 and commenced operations in Nigeria on 29 May 1999. The agency is headed by a chairman, appointed by the President for a four-year term, subject to National Assembly approval. The chairman has the sole responsibility of ensuring the provision of safe, efficient, effective, and economic Air Navigation Services within the agency's jurisdiction.

== Functions ==
NAMA, an agency in the aviation sector, bears the sole responsibility for ensuring the delivery of Air Navigation Services within its designated sphere of influence. NAMA develops airspace infrastructure such as the upgrade of the country's air traffic management system including the Safe Tower Project (STP) that aligns with the stringent Standards and Recommended Practices set by the International Civil Aviation Organization (ICAO).

== Controversies ==
- Collection of landing fee one of the scope of the agency is collection of landing fee of $300 from helicopter operators in the country which was described as controversial during the 53rd Annual General Meeting of the Nigerian Air Traffic Controllers Association held in Kano State, it was noted that the fee, previously dropped, was being reintroduced a few months ago which the industry operators opposed and threatening to sue the agency to court if the landing fee is forced on the sector.
- Multilateration technology system NAMA has been accused of being unable to fix the multilateration technology system, which is meant to monitor low-flying aircraft in the littoral regions of the country (Niger Delta), where oil and gas helicopter shuttle services are prevalent. Previously, the agency had boasted that it had completed performance-based navigation (PBN), comprising area navigation (RNAV) and required navigation performance (RNP). However, some sources alleged that such modern equipment has not been put to good use. Others claimed that only foreign airlines use the system because they have the necessary on-board equipment.

== Director-General ==
Tayib Odunowo previously served as chairman of the agency, followed by Lawrence Mathew Pwajok as acting managing director. Then, Farouk Ahmed Umar was appointed as the current chairman in December 2023. Previously, he served as the executive director of Safety Electronics and Engineering in 2016, appointed by former President Muhammadu Buhari.

== See also ==
- List of government space agencies
- Nigeria EduSat-1 (launched in 2017)
- Federal Ministry of Aviation (Nigeria)
