= Association of Asia Pacific Airlines =

International airline trade association

- Formation: 30 September 1966
- Type: Trade Association
- Location: Kuala Lumpur, Malaysia
- Members: See below
- Official language: English
- Director General: Subhas Menon
- Website: www.aapairlines.org

The Association of Asia Pacific Airlines (AAPA), formerly the Orient Airlines Association, is a trade association of major scheduled international airlines based in the Asia-Pacific region. Established in 1966 with headquarters in Makati, Philippines, the association has moved to its present headquarters in Kuala Lumpur, Malaysia. The primary purpose of the AAPA is to serve as a common forum for the articulation of members’ views on matters and issues of common interest, to foster close cooperation, and to bring about an atmosphere conducive to the stimulation of the travel and tourism industry.

Andrew Herdman held the position of Director General of the Association of Asia Pacific Airlines (AAPA) since November 2004 until February 2020, after which Subhas Menon joined AAPA as Director General in March 2020. Martin Eran-Tasker joined the AAPA as Technical Director in 2004 until July 2020, while Beatrice Lim joined the AAPA as Commercial Director in July 2005.

== Members ==
The association currently has 17 member airlines from the Asia-Pacific region:

- Air Astana
- Air India (SA)
- Air New Zealand (SA)
- All Nippon Airways (SA)
- Bangkok Airways
- Cathay Pacific (OW)
- China Airlines (ST)
- EVA Airways (SA)
- Garuda Indonesia (ST)
- Japan Airlines (OW)
- Lion Air
- Malaysia Airlines (OW)
- Philippine Airlines
- Royal Brunei Airlines
- Singapore Airlines (SA)
- Thai Airways International (SA)
- Vietnam Airlines (ST)

They collectively carry 285 million passengers and 10 million tonnes of cargo, representing approximately one-fifth of global air passenger traffic and one-third of global air cargo traffic respectively.

== Departments, Committees and Working Groups ==
Technical Affairs Department

- Technical Committee
- Flight Operations and Safety Working Group
- Engineering & Maintenance Working Group
- Materials Management Working Group
- Security Committee
- Cargo Security Working Group
- Environment Working Group
