= Midwestern Robotics Design Competition =

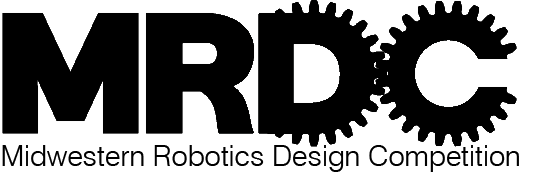

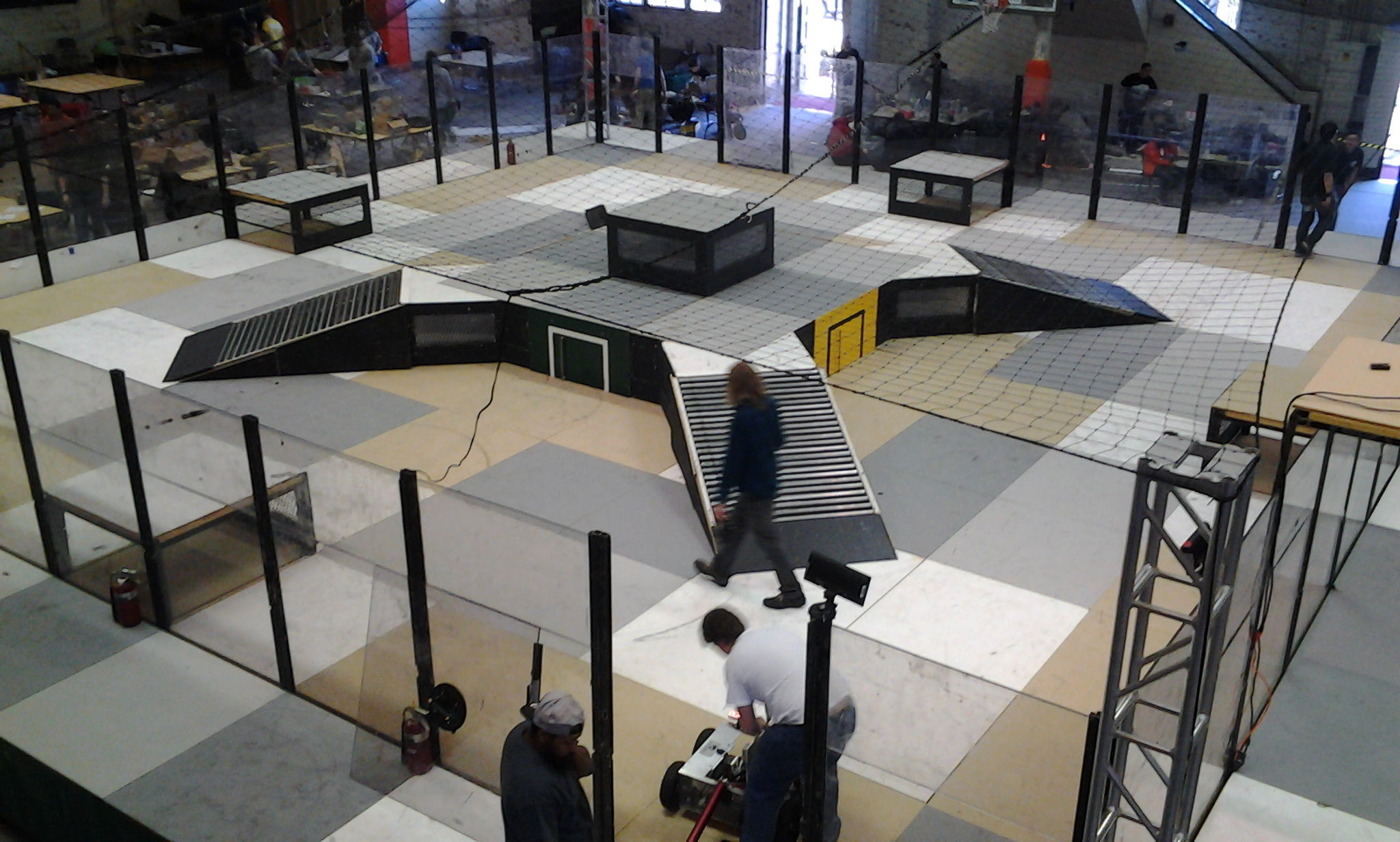
- 2014 JSDC course
- Status: discontinued
- Genre: Robotics competition
- Frequency: Annually
- Venue: Kenney Gym Annex
- Location: UIUC
- Country: USA
- Years active: 31–32
- Inaugurated: 1987
- Most recent: 9 March 2019
- Website: mrdc.ec.illinois.edu

The Midwestern Robotics Design Competition (MRDC) was an annual student-run robotics competition held every March at the University of Illinois Urbana-Champaign (UIUC), where participant teams competed with self-constructed robots in an annual game objective. The competition was first held in 1987 and at the time of its last event was one of the oldest continuing robotics competitions in the United States. Prior to 2016, it was named the AMD Jerry Sanders Creative Design Competition (JSDC) after Jerry Sanders, a University of Illinois alumnus and the co-founder and former long-time CEO of AMD.

A different game objective was created every year, intended to test the competitors' skills in creative design and functionality. Team registration usually ended in January, and was open to any college or university team. Multiple independent teams from the same university were allowed. Participating teams from universities across the Midwestern United States spent nearly a year designing and constructing their robot for the event, and traveled to the UIUC Engineering Open House in March to compete in the 2,000 sq ft (190 m^{2}) arena for the two-day (Fri-Sat) event. The Design Competition was funded by grants from ARM and was organized by the MRDC Committee at UIUC.

According to the MRDC website,

"The competition promotes engineering disciplines and offers students a chance to demonstrate their technical abilities and creativity while applying knowledge learned in engineering courses. Overall, the design competition presents a well-rounded multi-disciplinary engineering challenge to future engineers."

== Annual competitions ==
=== 7th annual competition (1994) ===
The 7th annual competition featured teams from several universities, including Purdue, that competed in a giant game of billiards, played with remote-controlled billiard balls. Competitors were provided an RC car and 18" plastic sphere. The objective was to push other balls into the pockets.

=== 23rd annual competition (2010) ===
The 23rd annual competition featured 20 teams from five different universities that competed in a giant game of tic-tac-toe, played with colored balloons.

=== 25th annual competition (2012) ===
A course littered with foam balls was prepared for the 2012 competition. The competing teams had to navigate the course, collect the balls with their robots, and deposit them into scoring bins.

=== 27th annual competition (2014) ===
To win the competition, one had to design a “cone transportation system” that transported traffic cones to specified areas in the arena, known as "territories", to win points. After a team successfully transported cones to a territory, said territory was said to be "under the control" of that team. There were three tiers of territories that awarded 1, 3, and 5 points when "controlled" for 10 seconds. Territories "controlled" at the end of the match awarded 10, 30, and 40 points.

=== 28th annual competition (2015) ===
The course was set up with four quadrants, with each robot starting within their “home” corner. Robots had to traverse obstacles such as moats, teeter totters, tunnels and doors that covered the course in order to collect the balls they needed to score. There were three types of balls used in the competition, foam balls, wiffle balls, and golf balls. Each type has a different point value assigned to it based on how hard it is to collect and place it into the scoring bin. Foam balls and wiffle balls are scored by getting them into a rotating bin and golf balls are scored by putting them into a hole on a putting green.

A demolition round followed the main competition, where the robots demolished each other. The Illinois Institute of Technology's team was the champion of the demolition round.

=== 29th annual competition (2016) ===
The 2016 course included two levels, and gates that opened and closed. This forced teams to work on a strategy to get into the inner circle before scoring in the game.

=== 31st annual competition (2018) ===
MRDC 2018 Winners
Prize	Team/Robot	Institute
First Place	QUIN	Northern Illinois University
Second Place	Ernie	Valparaiso University
Third Place	Marvin	Valparaiso University
Demolition Round Winner	ITR Goliath	Illinois Institute of Technology
Creative Design Award	Marvin	Valparaiso University

In the 2018 competition, teams had to score different balls on their respective targets on a course. Each round had four of the teams competing, and each team was to score as many points as they could by scoring soccer balls in team soccer ball goals and/or scoring foam balls in the center bin.

=== 32nd annual competition (2019) ===
MRDC 2019 Winners
Prize	Team/Robot	Institute
First Place	Remote Vehicle	Northern Illinois University
Second Place	STELLA	University of Illinois at Chicago
Third Place	Southern Budget	Southern Illinois University
Demolition Round Winner	ITR Goliath	Illinois Institute of Technology
Creative Design Award	Marvin	Valparaiso University

The 2019 competition included a sequencing game, where robots had to press buttons in a sequence, and a basketball game, where foam balls were to be shot into basketball hoops. There were a number of other rounds of challenges.

=== Discontinuation ===
In 2020, the competition was postponed indefinitely due to the COVID-19 outbreak. There has not been a competition held since the 2019 competition.
