= Direction des Services de la navigation aérienne =

- Industry: Air traffic control
- Founded: 2005
- Headquarters: Athis-Mons, France
- Number of locations: 5 Control Centers (2012)
- Area served: Nationwide
- Revenue: €1.692 billion (2018)
- Owner: France
- Number of employees: 3850+ (4000+ Air Traffic Controllers)

The direction des Services de la navigation aérienne (DSNA) is the agency in charge of air traffic control, communication and information for France. It is a part of the Ministry of Sustainable Development and was created by decree in February 2005. The DSNA works in close coordination with its military counterpart, DIRCAM and since 2011 military controllers and civil controllers are being integrated into the same control centers using the same systems. DSNA is integrated into the Central European Functional Airspace Block (FABEC). Maurice Georges is the Director of Air Navigation Services (DSNA) since July 2009. DSNA Headquarters is in Paris.

== Operating costs and fees ==
The DSNAs operating costs are covered by:

- Route charges ( "redevances de route ", collected by Eurocontrol for its 37 participating member states,
- Air traffic terminal charges ("redevance pour services terminaux de la circulation aérienne" — RSTCA)
- Oceanic charges (" redevance océanique" — ROC)
- Civil aviation tax ("Taxe Aviation Civile" — TAC)

The DSNA is a non-profit agency.

== Operations ==
The DSNA operates en route control centers in the following five locations:

- Brest
- Paris (HQ)
- Reims
- Aix-en-Provence
- Bordeaux

It also operates nine regional approach and control centers (SNAs):

- Nantes (SNA Ouest)
- Lille (SNA Nord)
- Paris (SNA Région Parisienne)
- Strasburg (SNA Nord Est)
- Lyon (SNA Centre Est)
- Nice (SNA Sud Est)
- Marseille (SNA Sud Sud Est)
- Toulouse (SNA Sud) et
- Bordeaux (SNA Sud Ouest)

The DSNA is the air traffic control operator with the largest number of flights controlled in Europe with nearly 3.3 million flights controlled in 2019 operating in an airspace of approximately 1.0 million square kilometers. With 11,311 flights controlled on July 12, 2019, the DSNA recorded the daily traffic record in Europe. In 2019, the traffic controlled in France consisted of 51% overflights, 36% of international flights (arriving from another country to France or departing from France to another country) and 13% of interior flights.

== Overseas ==
The DSNA has three regional centers for French overseas territories;

- "Antilles-French Guiana" (SNA AG)
- "Indian Ocean" (SNA OI)
- "Saint-Pierre-et-Miquelon" (SNA SPM)
