= List of supermarket chains in the Netherlands =

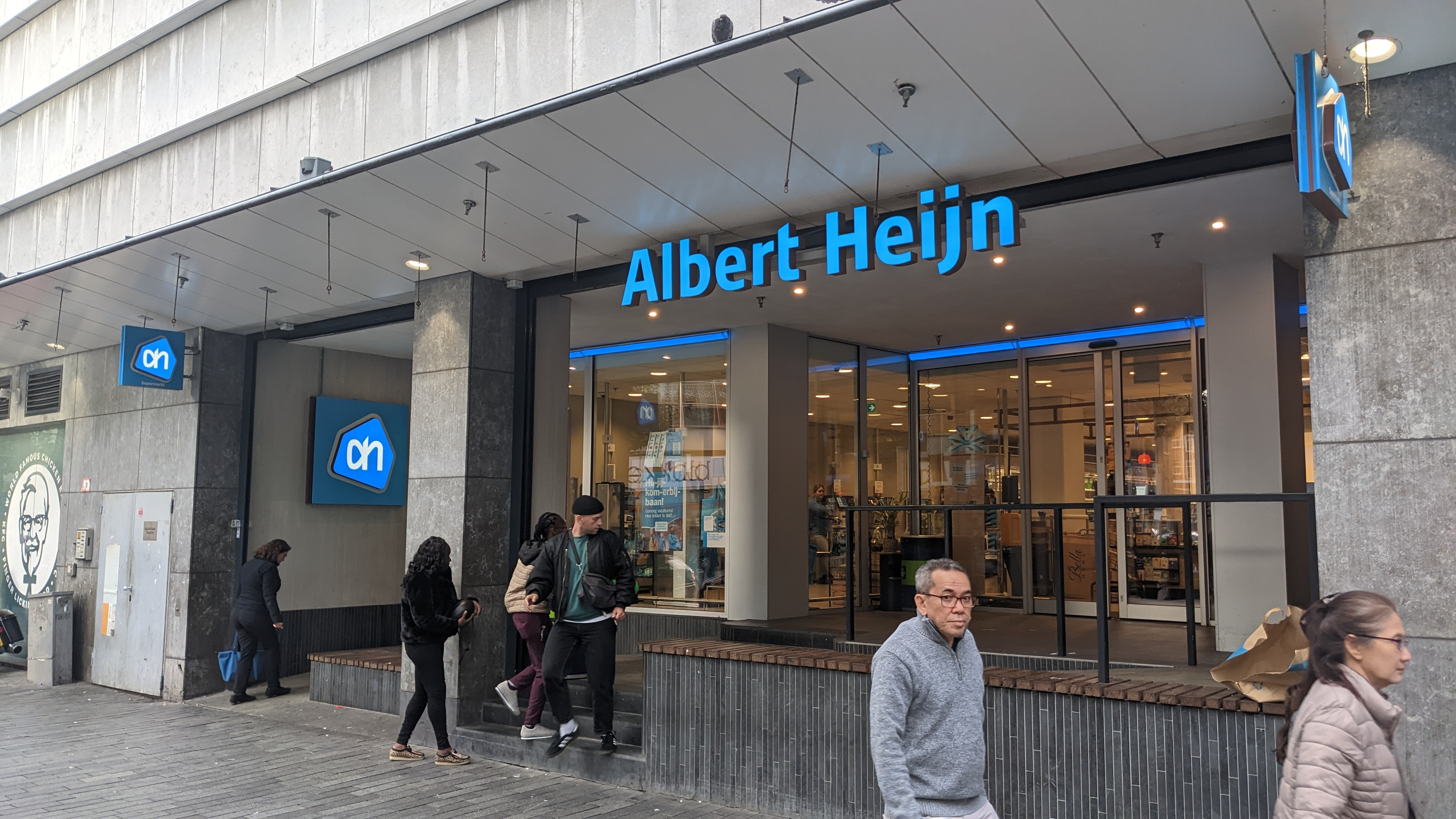
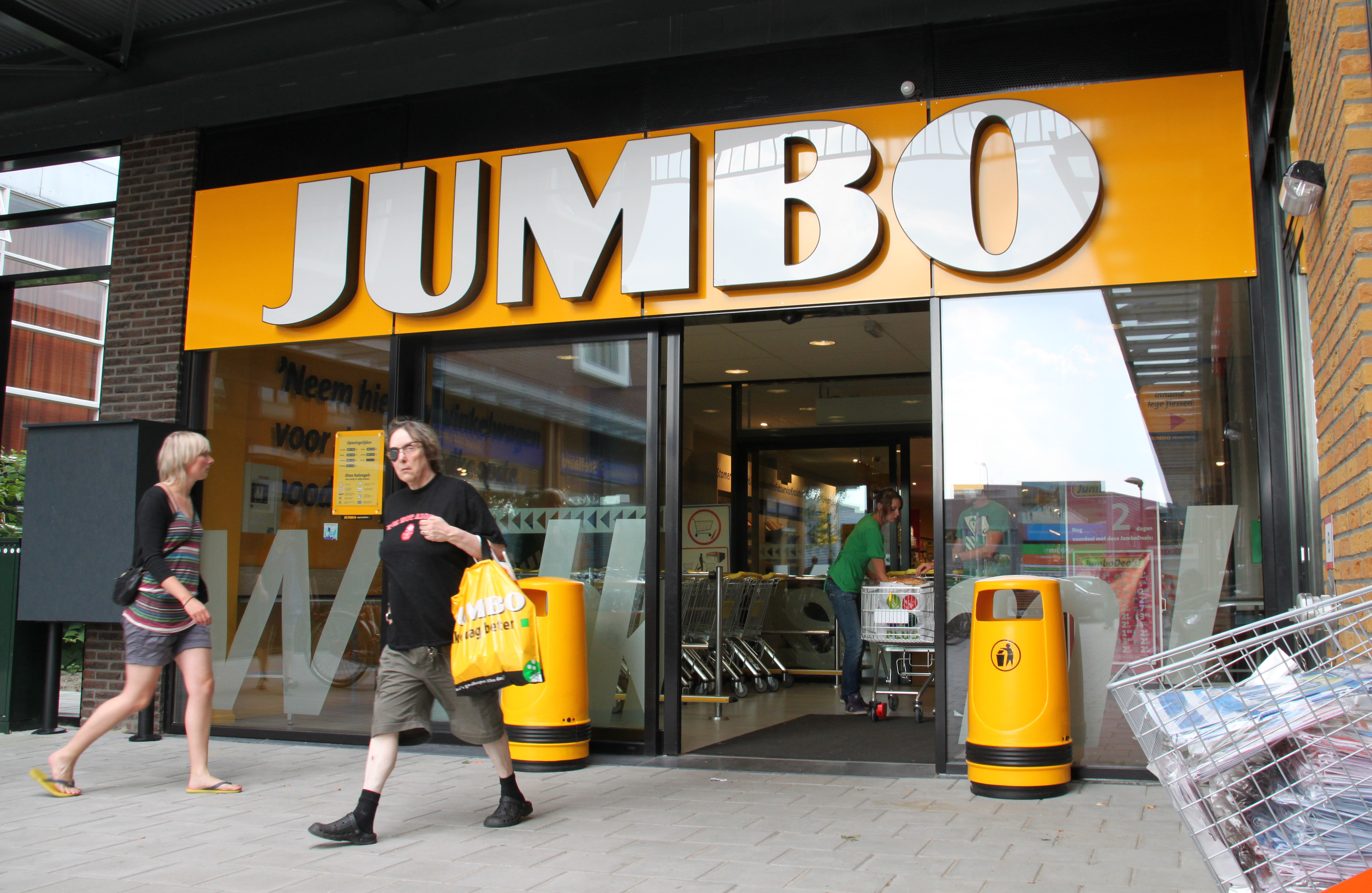
Albert Heijn (top) and Jumbo (bottom) are the two largest supermarket chains in the Netherlands in both revenue and number of stores.

On 1 January 2022 there were 6.390 supermarkets in the Netherlands. A 4.4 percent increase over the previous year (2021). In number of stores, Albert Heijn is the largest supermarket chain in the Netherlands followed by Jumbo and PLUS.

== Market share ==
Market share including hard discount and online according to IRI
	2019	2020
Albert Heijn	34.7	34.8
Jumbo	20.8	21.4
Superunie	27.3	27.5
Coop	3.7	3.9
Deen	2.0	2.0
Dirk van den Broek	3.7	3.6
Dekamarkt	1.7	1.7
Hoogvliet	2.0	2.0
Jan Linders	1.1	1.2
MCD	0.5	0.5
Plus	6.5	6.6
Poiesz	0.9	1.0
Spar	1.2	1.2
Hard discount (Aldi/Lidl)	16.2	15.6

== Current ==
Logo	Name	Stores	Parent/Purchasing cooperative	Founded	Summary of supermarket history
	Albert Heijn	1048	Ahold Delhaize	27 May 1887	Albert Heijn founded a grocery store in 1887 and over the years opened multiple locations and a central warehouse. He started roasting his own brand of coffee and producing other self-made items in the 1890s and early 1900s. In 1920, a company called Maatschappij tot Exploitatie der Fabrieken en Handelszaken was formed and Anton Jurgens of Unilever bought a 50% share, which was later bought back by the Heijn family. In 1941, the Purchasing Director had to go into hiding due to his Jewish heritage and was helped by Gerrit Heijn. The chain went public in 1948 and opened its first self-service store in 1952 and first supermarket in 1955. The company grew through acquisitions and in 1973 became part of Ahold NV, which helped it expand into foreign markets. The company faced a decline in market share in 2003, but expanded into Belgium and the Caribbean, but withdrew from the German market in 2018.
	Aldi	500+	Aldi Nord group	10 July 1946	Karl and Theo Albrecht's mother opened a small store in Germany in 1913 and they both worked in the store, Karl worked in a delicatessen. In 1945, Karl and Theo took over the family business, and by 1950 they owned 13 stores in the Ruhr Valley. They had a unique strategy of subtracting the legal maximum rebate of 3% before sale and removing merchandise that did not sell from their shelves. The brothers split the company in 1960 over a dispute about whether to sell cigarettes, forming Aldi Nord and Aldi Süd which became financially and legally separate in 1966. They started expanding internationally in 1967, with Aldi Süd acquiring the grocery chain Hofer in Austria and Aldi Nord opening its first stores abroad in the Netherlands in 1973. They retired as CEOs in 1993, and control of the company was placed in the hands of private family foundations.
	Boni	43	independent	1972	Boni is a Dutch supermarket chain that was founded in 1972 by Gerrit Klaassen as a family business. The name "Boni" comes from the word "bonus" and means "of the good" in Latin. The first store had a discount look and a wide variety of inexpensive products. Boni was originally part of Prisma Food Retail, but became an independent chain after Prisma was sold to Sligro Food Group in 2001. The company is one of 14 members of the purchasing association Superunie. The head office and distribution center are located in Nijkerk. In 2015, Boni acquired three C1000 stores, and in 2018 opened a new branch in Heerde, which was the first to experiment with a new store formula. The company currently has around 43 stores, mainly located in the center, west, and north of the country, near the A28 freeway.
	Boon's Markt	15	Boon Food Group	2013	In 1966, the formula began in Oosterhout as Marius & Cornelis Discount, shortened to MC Discount. The formula established itself mainly in Southwest Netherlands and still had 29 stores in 2018. Originally a discount supermarket, MCD was later transformed into a service supermarket formula. Parent company Boon Food Group launched the new formula Boon's Markt in Vlaardingen in 2013. The intention was to connect more with local consumers, while getting rid of MCD's expensive image. In 2017, it was announced that Boon Food Group wanted to phase out the MCD brand completely by renaming it Boon's Markt.
	Dagwinkel	74	Van Tol B.V.	30 June 2004	
	DekaMarkt	102	Detailresult Groep N.V.	1942	Dirk Kat opened his first grocery store in Velsen-Noord, Netherlands in 1941 but it had to close due to the German occupation. In 1949, he opened the first self-service store in the Netherlands under the name Kijkgrijp. In 1950, he established joint purchasing with other grocers for low prices. In 1952, he built a central warehouse and 1955 opened the first modern supermarket in the Netherlands. The name DekaMarkt was introduced in 1969 and was used in all stores by 1986. In 1974, the first liquor store was opened. In 2001, the company had a close cooperation with Dutch supermarket chain Dirk and in 2008, it merged with Dirk to form Detailresult Groep and both supermarkets continued to exist side by side. In 2013, the DekaMarkt stores were converted to a new format that gave them a market-like look and feel.
	Dirk	131	Detailresult Groep N.V	1942	The original business was established in 1942 by Dirk van den Broek (1924-2020) as a milk store in Amsterdam. In 1948 it was converted into a self-service market. The first supermarket was opened in 1953, also in Amsterdam. In 1972 Dirk started the Digros formule located in Katwijk, in 1973 he bought the supermarkets from Bas van der Heijden which were located around Rotterdam. In 2009 the company of Dirk van den Broek merged with Dirk Kat's DekaMarkt into the Detailresult Group. From 2014 its brands Dirk van den Broek, Digros and Bas van der Heijden continued as Dirk.
	EkoPlaza	143	Udea	2005	Jos Kamphuys started a pilot store called EkoPlaza in 2005 in Alkmaar, and the company expanded to other locations over the years. In 2010, EkoPlaza merged with another company called Udea. Udea then acquired Natudis in 2018 and Biofresh in 2019, becoming the largest producer of organic food in the Benelux region. By 2022, the company had a total of 109 outlets including 86 EkoPlaza stores, 58 EWA outlets and 3 EkoPlaza Foodmarqt stores in Amsterdam. Organic farming and demand for organic products has grown significantly since the opening of the first EkoPlaza store in 2005.
	Hoogvliet	71	independent	1968 (as Cash & Carry), 1974 (as Hoogvliet)	The first self-service store opened in 1968, then called Cash & Carry. However, this name was also used by other retailers. Leen Hoogvliet therefore decided to rename the company Hoogvliet in 1974. In 2003, Hoogvliet opened a branch in the Rotterdam borough of Hoogvliet of the same name. One of the largest branches is in Woudenberg. By 2009, the company had installed self-scanning checkouts in more than half of its stores.
	Jumbo	705	Van Eerd Group	1921	Jan and Anita Meurs opened the first Jumbo supermarket in 1979, in a former church building in Tilburg, Netherlands. The name Jumbo was chosen to one-up a local rival store called Torro. In 1983, the Jumbo store was bought by Van Eerd and expanded nationwide. As of 2006, Jumbo had 77 stores in the Netherlands, with a 3.4% market share. The head office and distribution center are located in Veghel, and they have three regional distribution centers. Jumbo became the second largest supermarket chain in the Netherlands after acquiring all of the C1000 stores in 2011. In 2016, Jumbo acquired V&D's restaurant chain, La Place, out of bankruptcy.
	Lidl	440	Schwarz Gruppe	1932	In 1932, Josef Schwarz became a partner in a fruit wholesaler and developed it into a general food wholesaler. In 1977, under the leadership of Dieter Schwarz, the company began to focus on discount markets, larger supermarkets, and cash and carry wholesale markets. The company named Lidl was opened in 1973, copying the Aldi concept and rigorously removing merchandise that did not sell from the shelves, and cutting costs by keeping the size of the retail outlets as small as possible. Lidl is part of the Schwarz Group, the fifth-largest retailer in the world. Lidl opened its first UK store in 1994 and its first store in the United States in Virginia Beach, Virginia in 2017. The company has continued to expand throughout the eastern U.S. and in 2020 announced that it planned to open up another 50 stores by the end of 2021.
	Makro	17	Metro AG	1968	SHV originated in 1896 from a merger of a number of large coal mining companies. In 1968, the first Makro store opened in Amsterdam and expanded to other European countries, the Americas, and Asia. In 1971, the first Makro store outside Europe opened in South Africa. In the 1970s and 1980s Makro expanded to the Americas and Asia. In 1989, Kmart bought the US locations and converted most of them to Pace Warehouse in 1990. In 1988, the first Makro store in Asia opened in Thailand. In 1990, the South African stores were exchanged for a shareholding in Massmart and in 2004 SHV sold its Massmart shares. In 1998, SHV Holdings sold Makro stores in Europe to German partner Metro AG. Makro opened its first store in the Philippines in 1996 through a joint-venture with SM Prime Holdings and Ayala Group. In 2007, SM Investments folded Makro stores into its operations and rebranded them as SM Hypermarkets and SM Savemore. In 2010, Makro Cash & Carry Indonesia was sold to Lotte Mart and rebranded as Lotte Mart Wholesale. In 2012, Metro sold the Makro UK business to Booker Group and Makro-Habib in Pakistan was rebranded as Metro-Habib. In 2013, SHV sold Siam Makro Pcl. (Thailand) to CP ALL, a subsidiary of CP Group. In 2014, Metro sold the Makro Greek business to Sklavenitis and rebranded as The Mart in 2016. In 2020, 30 of 54 Makro stores in Brazil were acquired by Carrefour. In December 2022, Makro Cash & Carry Belgium went bankrupt and all 6 shops closed permanently.
	Marqt	10	Udea	2006	
	MCD	29	Boon Food Group		
	Nettorama	32	independent	1968	
	PLUS	550+	De Sperwer U.A.	1988	The PLUS formula was created in 1988 as Plusmarkt, replacing De Sperwer’s previous 4 = 6 supermarket chain. In 2001, Plusmarkt was rebranded as PLUS. Online shopping with the option of home delivery or in-store collection was introduced at some branches in 2015. In 2006, as part of a consortium takeover with Sligro, De Sperwer purchased eighty branches of Edah from Laurus and converted them all to PLUS. De Sperwer also unsuccessfully attempted to take over Super de Boer and Emté in 2009 and 2018 respectively. On September 6, 2021, it was announced that the supermarket chains Plus and Coop have reached an agreement on a merger. The stores will continue under the name Plus, the name Coop will disappear and the combined organization is expected to become operational early next year.
	Poiesz	80	independent	19 April 1923	
	Spar	453	SPAR International B.V.	1932	Spar was founded in 1932 in South Holland, it is a multinational retail chain that operates in over 48 countries worldwide. The stores are owned independently, by a franchisee or by a chain, depending on the model applied in any given country. The name and the current logo was last revised in 1968 and has remained unchanged. Spar is known for neighborhood shops and also the sub-format Eurospar acting as mini-supermarkets. In recent years, Spar has expanded to various countries like Oman, Saudi Arabia, Qatar, United Arab Emirates, Nigeria, South Africa, Botswana, Namibia, Zimbabwe, Zambia, Mozambique, Seychelles, Sri Lanka, Cameroon, China, India. The company has been a major sponsor of the European Athletic Association and its events since 1996. In 2020, there were more than 13,500 Spar stores in 48 countries.
	Vomar	94	independent	1968	

=== Online only ===
Logo	Name	Parent/Purchasing Cooperative	Founded	Summary of supermarket history
	Crisp	independent	2018	
	Picnic	Picnic International B.V.	2015	

== Defunct ==
Logo	Name	Notes
	4=6	Formula converted to Plusmarkt, later Plus
	A&O	
	A&P	Dutch branches were taken over by C1000
	Agrimarkt	Formula by Spar, stores were converted to Spar in 2010s
	Attent	
	Bas van der Heijden	
	Basismarkt	
	Bingo	
	De Boer	Became part of Super de Boer
	C1000	Became part of Jumbo
	Centra	
	Coop	Merged with Plus
	Dagmarkt	
	Deen	Taken over by Albert Heijn, Vomar and DekaMarkt
	De Gruyter	
	DeWit (Komart)	Taken over by Coop Supermarkten, Deen and Hoogvliet
	Digros	
	Dreize	
	Edah	Became part of Sligro Food Group and Sperwer Holding
	Edah Lekker&Laag	Taken over by Laurus, after that, Sligro/Sperwer
	Elka	
	EMTÉ	Taken over by Jumbo and Coop
	E-markt	
	Fred van der Werff	
	Frit Even's Pick Pack	
	Garantmarkt	
	Gebr. de Jong	
	Golff	
Logo Gorillas (delivery company) color	Gorillas	Partially owned by Van Eerd Group (Dutch division only), Gorillas was a company that was founded in May 2020 by four individuals in Berlin. The company promised to deliver groceries and other supermarket goods ordered through its app via bike courier at the same prices as they charge in the supermarket. The company rapidly expanded to dozens of European cities and America, and raised over $1 billion in funding in the first two years of its existence. However, the company failed to live up to financial expectations and was forced to close stores in several countries and abandoned plans to expand to others. As a result, Gorillas entered negotiations to sell itself to a competitor, Getir, and the acquisition was announced in December 2022.
	Groenwoudt	
	Grofa-Arnhem	
	Grosmarkt	
	Gruma	
	Foodfactory	
	Fred van der Werff	
	Garantmarkt	
	Golff	Taken over by EMTÉ Supermarkten
	Groenwoudt	
	Grosmarkt	Taken over by Hermans Groep and Albert Heijn
	Jac Hermans	Taken over by A&P
	Jan Bruijns	
	Jan Linders	Joined Albert Heijn under franchise agreement.
	KC Markt	
	Kingsalmarkt	
	Super de Boer	Taken over by Jumbo, part sold to C1000, remaining shops renamed to Jumbo
	Konmar	Taken over by Albert Heijn, C1000 and Jumbo
	Kopak	
	Kroon	
	Korti	
	Kosma	
	Lekker & Laag	Taken over by Laurus, then by Jumbo
	Massamarkt	
	Maxis	
	MeerMarkt	Taken over by Spar
	Miro	
	M&M Supermarkten	
	Multi	
	Nieuwe Weme	
	Prijs Slag	
	Primarkt	
	Pryma	
	Sanders	Taken over by Sligro Food Group, shops have been renamed to EMTÉ
	Simon de Wit	
	Stipt	
	Super	
	TIP	
	TopTien Supermarkten	
	Torro	
	Trefcenter	
	Troefmarkt	
	Unigro	
	Vana	
	VéGé	
	VEZO	
	Vivo	
	Volumemarkt	
	Witte Prijzenhal	
