= Frits van Eerd =

Dutch businessman and racing driver (born 1967)

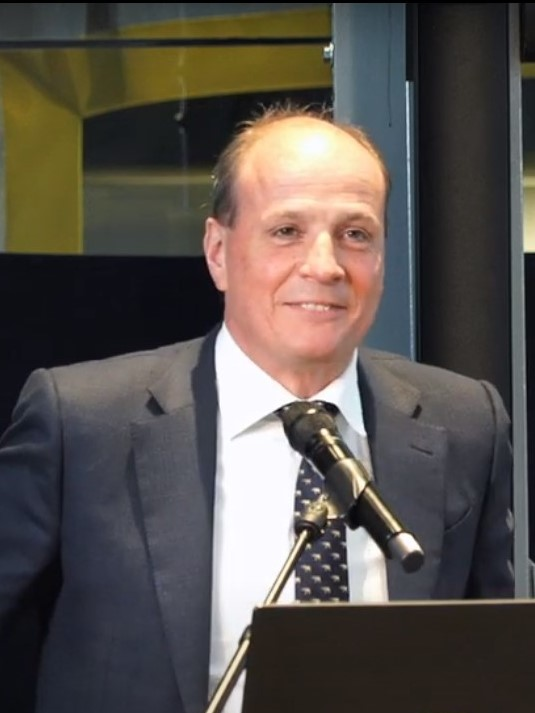
- van Eerd in 2019
- Born: Godefridus Franciscus Theodorus van Eerd; 25 March 1967 (age 59); Veghel, North Brabant, Netherlands
- Occupations: Businessman; racing driver
- Years active: 1999–present
- Categorisation: FIA Bronze

Championship titles
- 2021: FIA World Endurance Championship - LMP2 Pro/Am

Godefridus Franciscus Theodorus "Frits" van Eerd (born 25 March 1967) is a Dutch entrepreneur and racing driver. He was the general manager of Jumbo Groep Holding BV from 2002 to September 2022. As a racing driver, he won the 2021 FIA World Endurance Championship in the LMP2 Pro/Am category and co-founded Racing Team Nederland.

== Education and professional career ==
Van Eerd studied business administration in Utrecht and the United States. In 1992, he joined Jumbo, the family business founded by his father, Karel van Eerd. He started his career as a product manager of the bread department and later became supermarket manager. In 1996, he became general manager at Jumbo and in 2002 he was appointed general manager.

As general manager, van Eerd led the expansion of Jumbo, which was characterised by strategic acquisitions. Under his leadership, Super de Boer and C1000 were acquired, establishing Jumbo as one of the largest supermarket chains in the Netherlands. Van Eerd remained general manager until his resignation in 2022.

== Criminal investigation and resignation from Jumbo ==
In September 2022, van Eerd was involved in a large-scale money laundering investigation. The FIOD raided his home and the Jumbo head office in Veghel, The FIOD found €448,000 in cash, part of which hidden in a plastic bag in a refrigerator, mainly in five-hundred-euro banknotes. Van Eerd was arrested and interrogated for five days.

The trial against van Eerd began in September 2024. He was suspected of accepting bribes, issuing false invoices and engaging in ‘habitual money laundering’; the frequent money laundering that it became a habit.

In connection with the criminal case, van Eerd stepped down as general manager of Jumbo in September 2022 - initially temporarily for as long as the criminal investigation would last, but in March 2023 his departure became permanent with the appointment of interim CEO Ton van Veen as permanent chairman of the board.

Van Eerd was found guilty of money laundering, accepting bribes and forgery on 7 August 2025, and was sentenced to two years in prison.

In September 2025, Jumbo suspended Van Eerd's voting rights as a major shareholder following his conviction. The decision, made in consultation with the company's banks, was to remain in effect at least until the conclusion of the legal proceedings. Van Eerd had appealed his conviction.

== Racing career ==
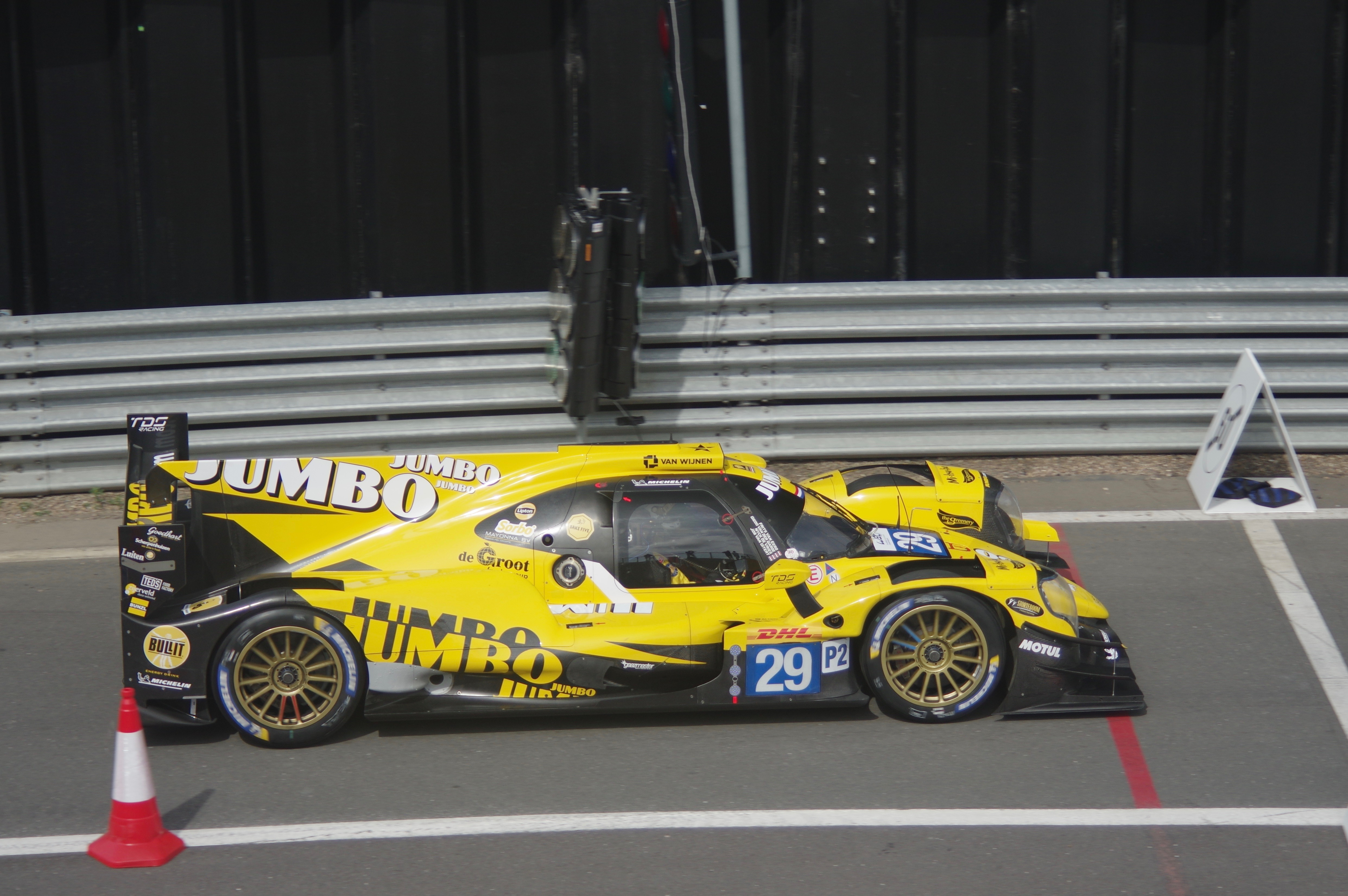
Racing Team Nederland Oreca 07 at WEC 4 Hours of Silverstone 2019.

In addition to his business career, van Eerd was active in motorsport. He started racing in Formula Renault in 1993 and became Benelux champion in 1996. He also participated in rallies, including the Dakar Rally, and founded Racing Team Nederland in 2017, which participated in the European Le Mans Series and the FIA World Endurance Championship. In 2019, his team won the 6 Hours of Fuji. In 2021, van Eerd won the FIA WEC championship in the LMP2 Pro/Am category.

=== Career summary ===
Season	Series	Team	Races	Wins	Poles	F/Laps	Podiums	Points	Position
1999	Formula Ford 1800 Nederland		2	0	0	0	0	4	27th
2005	Formula Ford 1800 Benelux - Div. 1	Geva Racing	4	0	0	0	1	25	10th
2005	Formula Ford 1800 Netherland - Div. 1	Geva Racing	5	0	0	0	1	42	9th
2006	EuroBOSS	Geva Racing	5	0	0	0	1	27	10th
2007	EuroBOSS	VES Racing	6	0	0	0	0	165	11th
2008	TopGear Westfield Cup	Jumbo Supermarkten	2	0	0	0	1	56	22nd
2008	EuroBOSS		6	?	?	?	?	154	7th
2010	BOSS GP - Open Class		2	0	0	0	1	24	12th
2011	BOSS GP - Open Class	Tyrrell F1 Team Holland	7	0	0	0	3	74	3rd
2013	BOSS GP - Open Class		?	?	?	?	?	?	?
2015	BOSS GP - Open Class	VES Benetton Racing	3	1	1	1	3	67	5th
2016	BOSS GP - Open Class	VES Racing	9	2	0	1	6	169	3rd
2016	FIA Masters Historic F1		3	0	0	0	0	0	18th
2017	European Le Mans Series - LMP2	Racing Team Nederland	6	0	0	0	0	12.5	17th
2017	24 Hours of Le Mans - LMP2	Racing Team Nederland	1	0	0	0	0	N/A	11th
2018	11th Historic Grand Prix of Monaco		1	0	0	0	0	N/A	25th
2018	24 Hours of Le Mans - LMP2	Racing Team Nederland	1	0	0	0	0	N/A	7th
2018	Dutch Winter Endurance Championship	Racing Team Nederland	2	1	1	0	2	10	2nd
2018–19	FIA World Endurance Championship - LMP2	Racing Team Nederland	8	0	0	0	0	85	6th
2019	24 Hours of Le Mans - LMP2	Racing Team Nederland	1	0	0	0	0	N/A	15th
2019–20	FIA World Endurance Championship - LMP2	Racing Team Nederland	8	1	1	1	4	130	6th
2020	24 Hours of Le Mans - LMP2	Racing Team Nederland	1	0	0	0	0	N/A	15th
2021	FIA World Endurance Championship - LMP2	Racing Team Nederland	6	0	0	0	1	67	9th
2021	FIA World Endurance Championship - LMP2 Pro/Am	Racing Team Nederland	6	4	2	0	5	167	1st
2021	24 Hours of Le Mans - LMP2	Racing Team Nederland	1	0	0	0	0	N/A	11th
2021	European Le Mans Series - LMP2	Racing Team Nederland	1	0	0	0	0	0	NC†
2022	IMSA SportsCar Championship - LMP2	Racing Team Nederland	4	0	0	2	3	676	15th
2022	13th Historic Grand Prix of Monaco - F1 '77-'80		1	0	0	0	0	0	6th
2024	14th Historic Grand Prix of Monaco - Serie F: F1 Grand Prix cars 3L (1977–1980)		1	0	0	0	0	0	12th
2024	14th Historic Grand Prix of Monaco - Serie G: F1 Grand Prix cars 3L (1981–1985)		1	0	0	0	0	0	10th

^{†} As Van Eerd was a guest driver, he was ineligible for points.
^{‡} Points only counted towards the Michelin Endurance Cup, and not the overall LMP2 Championship.

=== 24 Hours of Le Mans ===
Year	Team	Co-Drivers	Car	Class	Laps	Pos.	Class Pos.
2017	(Netherlands) Racing Team Nederland	(Brazil) Rubens Barrichello (Netherlands) Jan Lammers	Dallara P217-Gibson	LMP2	344	13rd	11th
2018	(Netherlands) Racing Team Nederland	(Netherlands) Giedo van der Garde (Netherlands) Jan Lammers	Dallara P217-Gibson	LMP2	356	11th	7th
2019	(Netherlands) Racing Team Nederland	(Netherlands) Giedo van der Garde (Netherlands) Nyck de Vries	Dallara P217-Gibson	LMP2	340	26th	15th
2020	(Netherlands) Racing Team Nederland	(Netherlands) Giedo van der Garde (Netherlands) Nyck de Vries	Oreca 07-Gibson	LMP2	349	19th	15th
2021	(Netherlands) Racing Team Nederland	(Netherlands) Giedo van der Garde (Netherlands) Job van Uitert	Oreca 07-Gibson	LMP2	356	16th	11th
2021	(Netherlands) Racing Team Nederland	(Netherlands) Giedo van der Garde (Netherlands) Job van Uitert	Oreca 07-Gibson	LMP2 Pro-Am	356	16th	2nd
