= Super de Boer =

Former supermarket chain in the Netherlands

- Industry: Retail
- Founded: Hoogeveen, Netherlands (28 November 1925)
- Founder: Evert de Boer
- Defunct: 11 July 2012
- Successor: Jumbo, C1000, SPAR
- Headquarters: Amersfoort, Netherlands
- Number of locations: 0
- Area served: Netherlands
- Key people: N. Onkenhout
- Owner: Super de Boer N.V.
- Website: superdeboer.nl at the Wayback Machine (archived 2011-07-24)

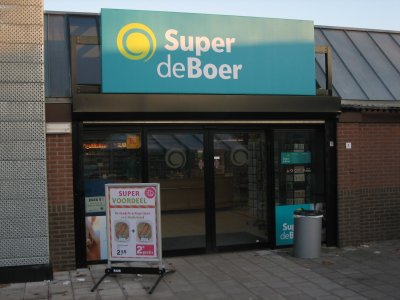
Typical Super de Boer supermarket

Super de Boer was a Dutch supermarket chain. The holding company which owned Super de Boer, Super de Boer N.V., was formerly named Laurus N.V.. It changed its name to that of its only remaining retail brand in January 2008.

Super de Boer supermarkets were partly owned by franchisors. The French food retail group Casino Guichard purchased a 37% stake in the firm in 2002, and increased this to 57% by 2008. The firm agreed to be taken private by Dutch rival Jumbo in October 2009 in a deal worth €552 million, with Casino selling its entire stake.

== History ==
The Super de Boer name comes from grocery stores opened by brothers Evert and Jan de Boer in 1925 and 1932. The two De Boer chains merged in 1970. In 1997, De Boer and rival Unigro formed De Boer Unigro. The De Boer supermarket chain was merged with Unigro's Super to form Super de Boer. In 1998, De Boer Unigro merged with Vendex N.V. to form Laurus, which had plans to rebrand all the stores under the Konmar name. In 2003, Laurus stopped the rebranding operation because of disappointing results. Existing Konmar stores were either transformed back to Super de Boer or remained using the Konmar brand.

In 2004, Laurus started renewing the store's image in "Operation Refresh Express". The goal of this renewal was to shake off the old, expensive image, as well as to freshen up the stores and private label products. Then, in 2006, Laurus decided to sell all of the Konmar and Edah stores to third parties, leaving Super de Boer as the only asset left for Laurus.

On September 18, 2009, the much smaller Jumbo announced that it wanted to take over Super de Boer and had made an offer of € 4.20 per share. Groupe Casino, which held approximately 57 percent of the Super de Boer shares, supported the offer. After a bidding war with Sperwer (Plus supermarkets), it was announced on October 19, 2009 that Jumbo had made the winning bid of € 4.82 per share. After the takeover, 80 Super de Boer stores were transferred to C1000, 19 Super de Boer stores were sold to Coop Supermarkets and another 24 to the supermarket chains PLUS, Poiesz, Deen, DekaMarkt, MCD and Spar. In addition, some franchisees decided to switch to Albert Heijn.

On July 11, 2012, the last Super de Boer was converted into a Jumbo.
