= 2019 6 Hours of Spa-Francorchamps =

Sports car endurance race held at Spa-Francorchamps

Layout of the Circuit de Spa-Francorchamps

The 2019 Total 6 Hours of Spa-Francorchamps was an endurance sports car racing event held at the Circuit de Spa-Francorchamps, Stavelot, Belgium on 2–4 May 2019. Spa-Francorchamps served as the seventh race of the 2018–19 FIA World Endurance Championship, and was the eighth running of the event as part of the championship. The race was won by the #8 Toyota TS050 Hybrid.

== Qualifying ==
=== Qualifying results ===
Pole position winners in each class are marked in bold.

| Pos. | Class | Team | Average Time | Gap | Grid |
|---|---|---|---|---|---|
| 1 | **LMP1** | **No. 7 Toyota Gazoo Racing** | **1:53.747** | - | **1** |
| 2 | LMP1 | No. 8 Toyota Gazoo Racing | 1:54.243 | +0.496 | 2 |
| 3 | LMP1 | No. 17 SMP Racing | 1:54.711 | +0.964 | 3 |
| 4 | LMP1 | No. 3 Rebellion Racing | 1:55.640 | +1.893 | 4 |
| 5 | LMP1 | No. 11 SMP Racing | 1:56.018 | +2.271 | 5 |
| 6 | LMP1 | No. 1 Rebellion Racing | 1:56.021 | +2.274 | 6 |
| 7 | **LMP2** | **No. 26 G-Drive Racing** | **2:00.674** | **+6.927** | **7** |
| 8 | LMP2 | No. 38 Jackie Chan DC Racing | 2:01.225 | +7.478 | 8 |
| 9 | LMP2 | No. 37 Jackie Chan DC Racing | 2:01.558 | +7.811 | 9 |
| 10 | LMP2 | No. 31 DragonSpeed | 2:01.816 | +8.069 | 10 |
| 11 | LMP2 | No. 36 Signatech Alpine Matmut | 2:01.832 | +8.085 | 11 |
| 12 | LMP1 | No. 4 ByKolles Racing Team | 2:02.246 | +8.499 | 12 |
| 13 | LMP2 | No. 29 Racing Team Nederland | 2:03.959 | +10.212 | 13 |
| 14 | LMP2 | No. 28 TDS Racing | 2:04.967 | +11.220 | 14 |
| 15 | LMP2 | No. 29 Larbre Compétition | 2:06.234 | +12.487 | 15 |
| 16 | **LMGTE Pro** | **No. 67 Ford Chip Ganassi Team UK** | **2:12.885** | **+19.138** | **16** |
| 17 | LMGTE Pro | No. 97 Aston Martin Racing | 2:12.952 | +19.205 | 17 |
| 18 | LMGTE Pro | No. 82 BMW Team MTEK | 2:12.977 | +19.230 | 18 |
| 19 | LMGTE Pro | No. 81 BMW Team MTEK | 2:13.313 | +19.566 | 19 |
| 20 | LMGTE Pro | No. 95 Aston Martin Racing | 2:13.341 | +19.594 | 20 |
| 21 | LMGTE Pro | No. 66 Ford Chip Ganassi Team UK | 2:13.392 | +19.645 | 21 |
| 22 | LMGTE Pro | No. 92 Porsche GT Team | 2:13.683 | +19.936 | 22 |
| 23 | LMGTE Pro | No. 91 Porsche GT Team | 2:13.836 | +20.089 | 23 |
| 24 | LMGTE Pro | No. 51 AF Corse | 2:14.060 | +20.313 | 24 |
| 25 | LMGTE Pro | No. 71 AF Corse | 2:14.182 | +20.435 | 25 |
| 26 | **LMGTE Am** | **No. 90 TF Sport** | **2:16.061** | **+22.314** | **26** |
| 27 | LMGTE Am | No. 88 Dempsey-Proton Racing | 2:16.171 | +22.424 | 27 |
| 28 | LMGTE Am | No. 56 Team Project 1 | 2:16.390 | +22.643 | 28 |
| 29 | LMGTE Am | No. 77 Dempsey-Proton Racing | 2:17.005 | +23.258 | 29 |
| 30 | LMGTE Am | No. 98 Aston Martin Racing | 2:17.093 | +23.346 | 30 |
| 31 | LMGTE Am | No. 54 Spirit of Race | 2:17.173 | +23.426 | 31 |
| 32 | LMGTE Am | No. 61 Clearwater Racing | 2:17.288 | +23.541 | 32 |
| 33 | LMGTE Am | No. 86 Gulf Racing | 2:19.225 | +25.478 | 33 |
| 34 | LMGTE Am | No. 70 MR Racing | No Time^{1} | — | 34 |

^1 – Motoaki Ishikawa crashed the No. 70 MR Racing car in qualifying, resulting in the car being unable to set a qualifying time.

== Race ==
=== Race result ===
The minimum number of laps for classification (70% of the overall winning car's race distance) was 114 laps. Class winners in bold.

| Pos. | Class | No. | Team | Drivers | Chassis | Tyre | Laps | Time/Retired |
| Pos. | Class | No. | Team | Drivers | Engine | Tyre | Laps | Time/Retired |
|---|---|---|---|---|---|---|---|---|
| 1 | **LMP1** | **8** | **(Japan) Toyota Gazoo Racing** | **(Spain) Fernando Alonso (Switzerland) Sébastien Buemi (Japan) Kazuki Nakajima** | **Toyota TS050 Hybrid** | MI | **133** | **5:44:41.101** |
| 1 | **LMP1** | **8** | **(Japan) Toyota Gazoo Racing** | **(Spain) Fernando Alonso (Switzerland) Sébastien Buemi (Japan) Kazuki Nakajima** | **Toyota 2.4L Turbo V6** | MI | **133** | **5:44:41.101** |
| 2 | LMP1 | 3 | (Switzerland) Rebellion Racing | (France) Nathanaël Berthon (France) Thomas Laurent (United States) Gustavo Menezes | Rebellion R13 | MI | 132 | +1 lap |
| 2 | LMP1 | 3 | (Switzerland) Rebellion Racing | (France) Nathanaël Berthon (France) Thomas Laurent (United States) Gustavo Menezes | Gibson GL458 4.5L V8 | MI | 132 | +1 lap |
| 3 | LMP1 | 11 | (Russia) SMP Racing | (Russia) Mikhail Aleshin (Russia) Vitaly Petrov (Belgium) Stoffel Vandoorne | BR Engineering BR1 | MI | 132 | +1 lap |
| 3 | LMP1 | 11 | (Russia) SMP Racing | (Russia) Mikhail Aleshin (Russia) Vitaly Petrov (Belgium) Stoffel Vandoorne | AER P60B 2.4L Turbo V6 | MI | 132 | +1 lap |
| 4 | LMP1 | 17 | (Russia) SMP Racing | (Russia) Egor Orudzhev (France) Stéphane Sarrazin (Russia) Sergey Sirotkin | BR Engineering BR1 | MI | 131 | +2 laps |
| 4 | LMP1 | 17 | (Russia) SMP Racing | (Russia) Egor Orudzhev (France) Stéphane Sarrazin (Russia) Sergey Sirotkin | AER P60B 2.4L Turbo V6 | MI | 131 | +2 laps |
| 5 | LMP1 | 1 | (Switzerland) Rebellion Racing | (Switzerland) Neel Jani (Germany) André Lotterer (Brazil) Bruno Senna | Rebellion R13 | MI | 130 | +3 laps |
| 5 | LMP1 | 1 | (Switzerland) Rebellion Racing | (Switzerland) Neel Jani (Germany) André Lotterer (Brazil) Bruno Senna | Gibson GL458 4.5L V8 | MI | 130 | +3 laps |
| 6 | LMP1 | 7 | (Japan) Toyota Gazoo Racing | (United Kingdom) Mike Conway (Japan) Kamui Kobayashi (Argentina) José María López | Toyota TS050 Hybrid | MI | 129 | +4 laps |
| 6 | LMP1 | 7 | (Japan) Toyota Gazoo Racing | (United Kingdom) Mike Conway (Japan) Kamui Kobayashi (Argentina) José María López | Toyota 2.4L Turbo V6 | MI | 129 | +4 laps |
| 7 | **LMP2** | **31** | **(United States) DragonSpeed** | **(United Kingdom) Anthony Davidson (Mexico) Roberto Gonzalez (Venezuela) Pastor Maldonado** | **Oreca 07** | MI | **129** | **+4 laps** |
| 7 | **LMP2** | **31** | **(United States) DragonSpeed** | **(United Kingdom) Anthony Davidson (Mexico) Roberto Gonzalez (Venezuela) Pastor Maldonado** | **Gibson GK428 4.2L V8** | MI | **129** | **+4 laps** |
| 8 | LMP2 | 26 | (Russia) G-Drive Racing | (Russia) Roman Rusinov (Netherlands) Job van Uitert (France) Jean-Éric Vergne | Aurus 01 | D | 129 | +4 laps |
| 8 | LMP2 | 26 | (Russia) G-Drive Racing | (Russia) Roman Rusinov (Netherlands) Job van Uitert (France) Jean-Éric Vergne | Gibson GK428 4.2L V8 | D | 129 | +4 laps |
| 9 | LMP2 | 36 | (France) Singatech Alpine Matmut | (France) Nicolas Lapierre (Brazil) André Negrão (France) Pierre Thiriet | Alpine A470 | MI | 129 | +4 laps |
| 9 | LMP2 | 36 | (France) Singatech Alpine Matmut | (France) Nicolas Lapierre (Brazil) André Negrão (France) Pierre Thiriet | Gibson GK428 4.2L V8 | MI | 129 | +4 laps |
| 10 | LMP2 | 38 | (China) Jackie Chan DC Racing | (France) Gabriel Aubry (Monaco) Stéphane Richelmi (China) Ho-Pin Tung | Oreca 07 | D | 129 | +4 laps |
| 10 | LMP2 | 38 | (China) Jackie Chan DC Racing | (France) Gabriel Aubry (Monaco) Stéphane Richelmi (China) Ho-Pin Tung | Gibson GK428 4.2L V8 | D | 129 | +4 laps |
| 11 | LMP2 | 28 | (France) TDS Racing | (France) Norman Nato (France) François Perrodo (France) Matthieu Vaxivière | Oreca 07 | D | 128 | +5 laps |
| 11 | LMP2 | 28 | (France) TDS Racing | (France) Norman Nato (France) François Perrodo (France) Matthieu Vaxivière | Gibson GK428 4.2L V8 | D | 128 | +5 laps |
| 12 | LMP2 | 29 | (Netherlands) Racing Team Nederland | (Netherlands) Frits van Eerd (Netherlands) Giedo van der Garde (Netherlands) Nyck de Vries | Dallara P217 | MI | 127 | +6 laps |
| 12 | LMP2 | 29 | (Netherlands) Racing Team Nederland | (Netherlands) Frits van Eerd (Netherlands) Giedo van der Garde (Netherlands) Nyck de Vries | Gibson GK428 4.2L V8 | MI | 127 | +6 laps |
| 13 | LMP2 | 37 | (China) Jackie Chan DC Racing | (Denmark) David Heinemeier Hansson (United Kingdom) Jordan King (United Kingdom) Will Stevens | Oreca 07 | D | 127 | +6 laps |
| 13 | LMP2 | 37 | (China) Jackie Chan DC Racing | (Denmark) David Heinemeier Hansson (United Kingdom) Jordan King (United Kingdom) Will Stevens | Gibson GK428 4.2L V8 | D | 127 | +6 laps |
| 14 | LMP2 | 50 | (France) Larbre Compétition | (United States) Nicholas Boulle (France) Erwin Creed (France) Romano Ricci | Ligier JS P217 | MI | 126 | +7 laps |
| 14 | LMP2 | 50 | (France) Larbre Compétition | (United States) Nicholas Boulle (France) Erwin Creed (France) Romano Ricci | Gibson GK428 4.2L V8 | MI | 126 | +7 laps |
| 15 | **LMGTE; Pro** | **97** | **(United Kingdom) Aston Martin Racing** | **(United Kingdom) Alex Lynn (Belgium) Maxime Martin** | **Aston Martin Vantage AMR** | MI | **124** | **+9 laps** |
| 15 | **LMGTE; Pro** | **97** | **(United Kingdom) Aston Martin Racing** | **(United Kingdom) Alex Lynn (Belgium) Maxime Martin** | **Aston Martin 4.0L Turbo V8** | MI | **124** | **+9 laps** |
| 16 | LMGTE; Pro | 51 | (Italy) AF Corse | (United Kingdom) James Calado (Italy) Alessandro Pier Guidi | Ferrari 488 GTE Evo | MI | 124 | +9 laps |
| 16 | LMGTE; Pro | 51 | (Italy) AF Corse | (United Kingdom) James Calado (Italy) Alessandro Pier Guidi | Ferrari F154CB 3.9L Turbo V8 | MI | 124 | +9 laps |
| 17 | LMGTE; Pro | 92 | (Germany) Porsche GT Team | (Denmark) Michael Christensen (France) Kévin Estre | Porsche 911 RSR | MI | 124 | +9 laps |
| 17 | LMGTE; Pro | 92 | (Germany) Porsche GT Team | (Denmark) Michael Christensen (France) Kévin Estre | Porsche 4.0L Flat 6 | MI | 124 | +9 laps |
| 18 | LMGTE; Pro | 82 | (Germany) BMW Team MTEK | (Portugal) António Félix da Costa (Brazil) Augusto Farfus | BMW M8 GTE | MI | 124 | +9 laps |
| 18 | LMGTE; Pro | 82 | (Germany) BMW Team MTEK | (Portugal) António Félix da Costa (Brazil) Augusto Farfus | BMW S63 4.0L Turbo V8 | MI | 124 | +9 laps |
| 19 | LMGTE; Pro | 67 | (United States) Ford Chip Ganassi Team UK | (United Kingdom) Andy Priaulx (United Kingdom) Harry Tincknell | Ford GT | MI | 124 | +9 laps |
| 19 | LMGTE; Pro | 67 | (United States) Ford Chip Ganassi Team UK | (United Kingdom) Andy Priaulx (United Kingdom) Harry Tincknell | Ford EcoBoost 3.5L Turbo V6 | MI | 124 | +9 laps |
| 20 | LMGTE; Pro | 71 | (Italy) AF Corse | (United Kingdom) Sam Bird (Italy) Davide Rigon | Ferrari 488 GTE Evo | MI | 124 | +9 laps |
| 20 | LMGTE; Pro | 71 | (Italy) AF Corse | (United Kingdom) Sam Bird (Italy) Davide Rigon | Ferrari F154CB 3.9L Turbo V8 | MI | 124 | +9 laps |
| 21 | LMGTE; Pro | 95 | (United Kingdom) Aston Martin Racing | (Denmark) Marco Sørensen (Denmark) Nicki Thiim | Aston Martin Vantage AMR | MI | 124 | +9 laps |
| 21 | LMGTE; Pro | 95 | (United Kingdom) Aston Martin Racing | (Denmark) Marco Sørensen (Denmark) Nicki Thiim | Aston Martin 4.0L Turbo V8 | MI | 124 | +9 laps |
| 22 | LMGTE; Pro | 91 | (Germany) Porsche GT Team | (Italy) Gianmaria Bruni (Austria) Richard Lietz | Porsche 911 RSR | MI | 124 | +9 laps |
| 22 | LMGTE; Pro | 91 | (Germany) Porsche GT Team | (Italy) Gianmaria Bruni (Austria) Richard Lietz | Porsche 4.0L Flat 6 | MI | 124 | +9 laps |
| 23 | LMGTE; Pro | 81 | (Germany) BMW Team MTEK | (Netherlands) Nicky Catsburg (Germany) Martin Tomczyk | BMW M8 GTE | MI | 124 | +9 laps |
| 23 | LMGTE; Pro | 81 | (Germany) BMW Team MTEK | (Netherlands) Nicky Catsburg (Germany) Martin Tomczyk | BMW S63 4.0L Turbo V8 | MI | 124 | +9 laps |
| 24 | LMGTE; Pro | 66 | (United States) Ford Chip Ganassi Team UK | (Germany) Stefan Mücke (France) Olivier Pla | Ford GT | MI | 123 | +10 laps |
| 24 | LMGTE; Pro | 66 | (United States) Ford Chip Ganassi Team UK | (Germany) Stefan Mücke (France) Olivier Pla | Ford EcoBoost 3.5L Turbo V6 | MI | 123 | +10 laps |
| 25 | **LMGTE; Am** | **77** | **(Germany) Dempsey – Proton Racing** | **(Australia) Matt Campbell (Italy) Riccardo Pera (Germany) Christian Ried** | **Porsche 911 RSR** | MI | **122** | **+11 laps** |
| 25 | **LMGTE; Am** | **77** | **(Germany) Dempsey – Proton Racing** | **(Australia) Matt Campbell (Italy) Riccardo Pera (Germany) Christian Ried** | **Porsche 4.0L Flat 6** | MI | **122** | **+11 laps** |
| 26 | LMGTE; Am | 90 | (United Kingdom) TF Sport | (Republic of Ireland) Charlie Eastwood (United Kingdom) Euan Hankey (Turkey) Salih Yoluç | Aston Martin Vantage GTE | MI | 122 | +11 laps |
| 26 | LMGTE; Am | 90 | (United Kingdom) TF Sport | (Republic of Ireland) Charlie Eastwood (United Kingdom) Euan Hankey (Turkey) Salih Yoluç | Aston Martin 4.5L V8 | MI | 122 | +11 laps |
| 27 | LMGTE; Am | 61 | (Singapore) Clearwater Racing | (Italy) Matteo Cressoni (Republic of Ireland) Matt Griffin (Argentina) Luís Pérez Companc | Ferrari 488 GTE Evo | MI | 122 | +11 laps |
| 27 | LMGTE; Am | 61 | (Singapore) Clearwater Racing | (Italy) Matteo Cressoni (Republic of Ireland) Matt Griffin (Argentina) Luís Pérez Companc | Ferrari F154CB 3.9L Turbo V8 | MI | 122 | +11 laps |
| 28 | LMGTE; Am | 54 | (Switzerland) Spirit of Race | (Italy) Francesco Castellacci (Italy) Giancarlo Fisichella (Switzerland) Thomas Flohr | Ferrari 488 GTE Evo | MI | 122 | +11 laps |
| 28 | LMGTE; Am | 54 | (Switzerland) Spirit of Race | (Italy) Francesco Castellacci (Italy) Giancarlo Fisichella (Switzerland) Thomas Flohr | Ferrari F154CB 3.9L Turbo V8 | MI | 122 | +11 laps |
| 29 | LMGTE; Am | 56 | (Germany) Team Project 1 | (Germany) Jörg Bergmeister (United States) Patrick Lindsey (Norway) Egidio Perfetti | Porsche 911 RSR | MI | 122 | +11 laps |
| 29 | LMGTE; Am | 56 | (Germany) Team Project 1 | (Germany) Jörg Bergmeister (United States) Patrick Lindsey (Norway) Egidio Perfetti | Porsche 4.0L Flat 6 | MI | 122 | +11 laps |
| 30 | LMGTE; Am | 98 | (United Kingdom) Aston Martin Racing | (Canada) Paul Dalla Lana (Portugal) Pedro Lamy (Austria) Mathias Lauda | Aston Martin Vantage GTE | MI | 121 | +12 laps |
| 30 | LMGTE; Am | 98 | (United Kingdom) Aston Martin Racing | (Canada) Paul Dalla Lana (Portugal) Pedro Lamy (Austria) Mathias Lauda | Aston Martin 4.5L V8 | MI | 121 | +12 laps |
| 31 | LMGTE; Am | 86 | (United Kingdom) Gulf Racing | (United Kingdom) Ben Barker (Austria) Thomas Preining (United Kingdom) Michael Wainwright | Porsche 911 RSR | MI | 121 | +12 laps |
| 31 | LMGTE; Am | 86 | (United Kingdom) Gulf Racing | (United Kingdom) Ben Barker (Austria) Thomas Preining (United Kingdom) Michael Wainwright | Porsche 4.0L Flat 6 | MI | 121 | +12 laps |
| 32 | LMGTE; Am | 70 | (Japan) MR Racing | (Monaco) Olivier Beretta (Italy) Eddie Cheever III (Japan) Motoaki Ishikawa | Ferrari 488 GTE Evo | MI | 120 | +13 laps |
| 32 | LMGTE; Am | 70 | (Japan) MR Racing | (Monaco) Olivier Beretta (Italy) Eddie Cheever III (Japan) Motoaki Ishikawa | Ferrari F154CB 3.9L Turbo V8 | MI | 120 | +13 laps |
| 33 | LMGTE; Am | 88 | (Germany) Dempsey – Proton Racing | (Italy) Matteo Cairoli (Italy) Gianluca Roda (Italy) Giorgio Roda | Porsche 911 RSR | MI | 115 | +18 laps |
| 33 | LMGTE; Am | 88 | (Germany) Dempsey – Proton Racing | (Italy) Matteo Cairoli (Italy) Gianluca Roda (Italy) Giorgio Roda | Porsche 4.0L Flat 6 | MI | 115 | +18 laps |
| 34 | LMP1 | 4 | (Austria) ByKolles Racing Team | (France) Tom Dillmann (Italy) Paolo Ruberti (United Kingdom) Oliver Webb | ENSO CLM P1/01 | MI | 95 | +38 laps |
| 34 | LMP1 | 4 | (Austria) ByKolles Racing Team | (France) Tom Dillmann (Italy) Paolo Ruberti (United Kingdom) Oliver Webb | Gibson GL458 4.5L V8 | MI | 95 | +38 laps |

== Standings after the race ==
2018–2019 LMP World Endurance Drivers' Championship

| Pos. | +/– | Driver | Points |
|---|---|---|---|
| 1 | | (Spain) Fernando Alonso (Japan) Kazuki Nakajima (Switzerland) Sébastien Buemi | 160 |
| 2 | | (Japan) Kamui Kobayashi (United Kingdom) Mike Conway (Argentina) José María López | 129 |
| 3 | | (France) Thomas Laurent (United States) Gustavo Menezes | 99 |
| 4 | | (Switzerland) Mathias Beche | 73 |
| 5 | | (Switzerland) Neel Jani (Germany) André Lotterer | 73 |

2018–2019 LMP1 World Endurance Championship

| Pos. | +/– | Team | Points |
|---|---|---|---|
| 1 | | (Japan) Toyota Gazoo Racing | 177 |
| 2 | | (Switzerland) Rebellion Racing | 116 |
| 3 | | (Russia) SMP Racing | 86 |
| 4 | | (Austria) ByKolles Racing Team | 22.5 |
| 5 | | (United States) DragonSpeed | 8.5 |
| 6 | | (China) CEFC TRSM Racing | 1 |

- Note: Only the top five positions are included for the Drivers' Championship standings.

2018–2019 World Endurance GTE Drivers' Championship

| Pos. | +/– | Driver | Points |
|---|---|---|---|
| 1 | | (Denmark) Michael Christensen (France) Kévin Estre | 140 |
| 2 | | (Italy) Gianmaria Bruni (Austria) Richard Lietz | 104 |
| 3 | | (United Kingdom) James Calado (Italy) Alessandro Pier Guidi | 98.5 |
| 4 | | (Germany) Stefan Mücke (France) Olivier Pla | 70 |
| 5 | 1 | (United Kingdom) Andy Priaulx (United Kingdom) Harry Tincknell | 67 |

2018–2019 World Endurance GTE Manufacturers' Championship

| Pos. | +/– | Constructor | Points |
|---|---|---|---|
| 1 | | (Germany) Porsche | 246 |
| 2 | | (Italy) Ferrari | 153 |
| 3 | | (United States) Ford | 137 |
| 4 | | (United Kingdom) Aston Martin | 133 |
| 5 | | (Germany) BMW | 101 |

- Note: Only the top five positions are included for the Drivers' Championship standings.

FIA World Endurance Championship
| Previous race: 1000 Miles of Sebring | 2018–19 season | Next race: 24 Hours of Le Mans |
