= Racing Team Nederland =

Racing team competing in the World Endurance Championship

- Founded: 2016
- Folded: 2023
- Former series: FIA World Endurance Championship; IMSA SportsCar Championship; European Le Mans Series
- Noted drivers: (Netherlands) Frits van Eerd (Netherlands) Jan Lammers (Netherlands) Giedo van der Garde (Netherlands) Nyck de Vries (Netherlands) Job van Uitert (Brazil) Rubens Barrichello (United States) Dylan Murry
- Teams' Championships: FIA World Endurance Championship - LMP2 Pro-Am: 2021
- Drivers' Championships: FIA World Endurance Championship - LMP2 Pro-Am: 2021 : Frits van Eerd

Racing Team Nederland was a Dutch endurance racing team founded by F1 driver and Le Mans winner Jan Lammers and businessman Frits van Eerd.

== History ==
Frits van Eerd was one of the sponsors of Racing for Holland with his company (Jumbo Supermarket), with the team being owned by Lammers from 2001 onward. During this sponsorship Frits and Jan have said: "... and since then we said it would be nice to do one day of Le Mans together".

The main sponsor for the team was the Dutch oriented supermarket chain named "Jumbo Supermarkets" of which Frits was one of the owners. The colors of the team are mainly influenced by the Jumbo colors, which in turn have been influenced by the early years (1985–1992) of the Minardi F1 Team.

=== 2017 ===
The team started in the 2017 European Le Mans Series with a Dallara P217 from Dayvtec Engineering, ending the season on 11th place in LMP2 with 12.5 points. During the Le Mans race that year, the third driver was former F1 driver Rubens Barrichello. Jan and Rubens knew each other from when Rubens tested a Formula Opel Lotus from Jan years ago. In 2017 they finished Le Mans 13th overall (11th in the class).

=== 2018 ===
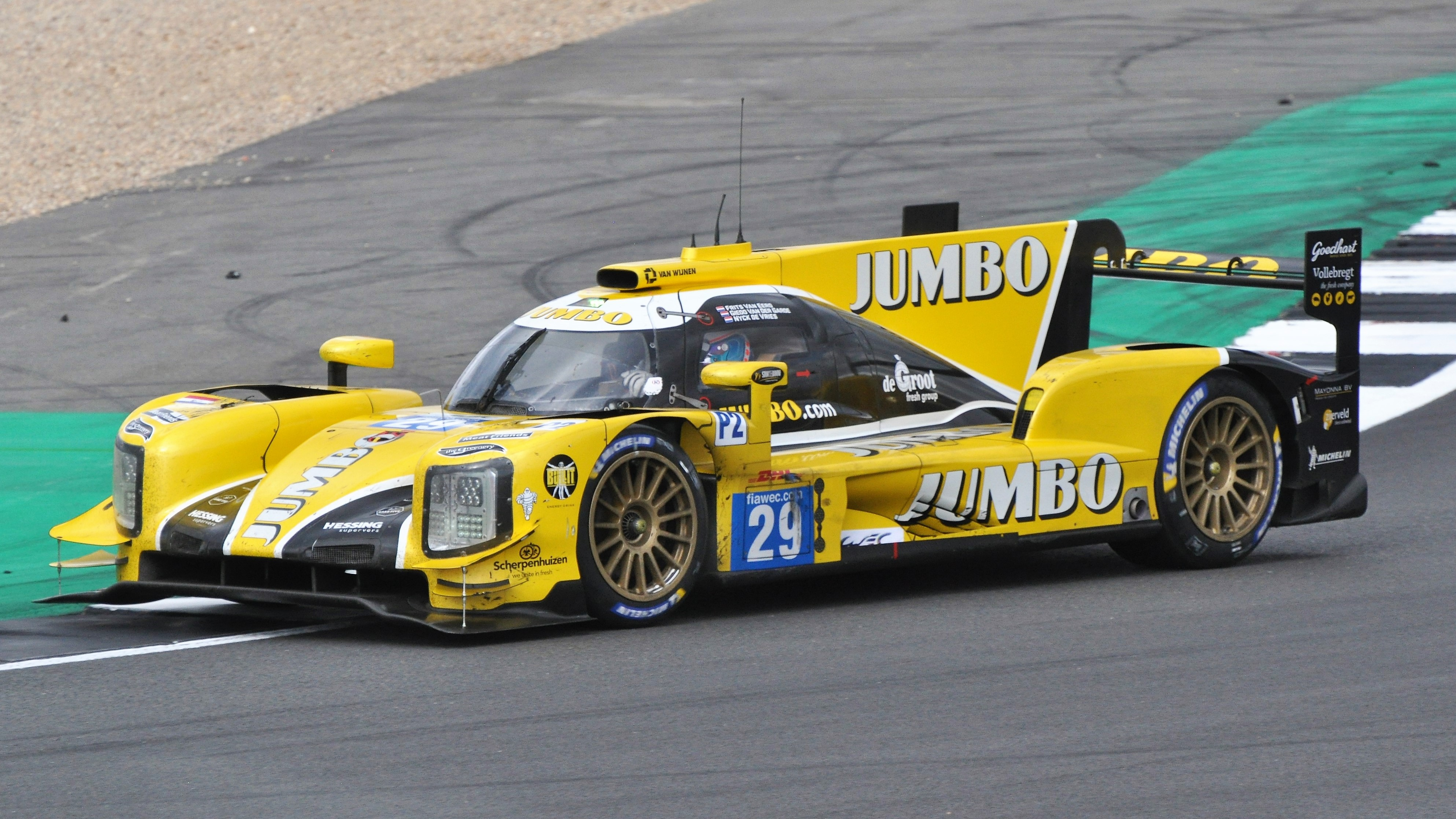
Racing Team Nederland Dallara P217 with Nyck de Vries driving at 6 Hours of Silverstone 2018

One season later, the team made the step to the 2018–19 FIA World Endurance Championship.

For the WEC Superseason of 2018-2019 Racing Team Nederland added ex-Formula 1 driver Giedo van der Garde as their new driver. After the 2018 race of the 24 Hours of Le Mans, Jan Lammers stepped down as an active driver for Racing Team Nederland. Formula 2 driver Nyck de Vries took over the seat from Lammers for the rest of the season.

In the 2018 24 Hours of Le Mans the team finished 7th in the class and 11th overall.

=== 2019 ===
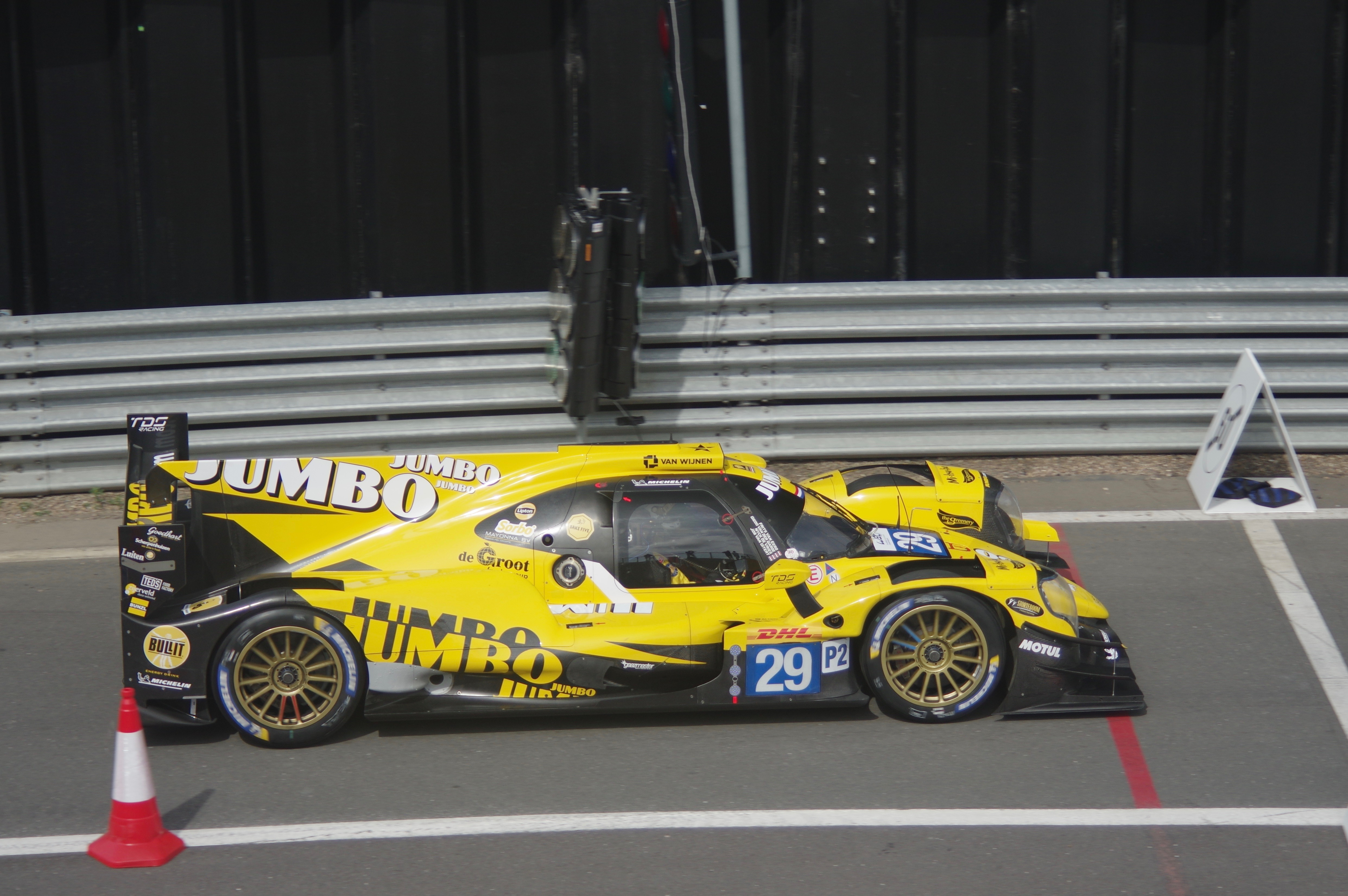
Racing Team Nederland Oreca 07 at WEC 4 Hours of Silverstone 2019

In 2019 24 Hours of Le Mans the team finished 15th in the class and 26th overall. They finished the 2018-2019 WEC season in 6th place.

The team entered the 2019–20 FIA World Endurance Championship with a new team and a new car. They were operated by TDS Racing and entered an Oreca 07. In the first race with their new car they finished 3rd in the 2019 4 Hours of Silverstone, which was their first podium. They continued their good form in the next race with their first victory, in the 2019 6 Hours of Fuji, in what was described as 'LMP2 thriller' by media.

=== 2022 ===
In December 2021, Racing Team Nederland announced that they would be switching their focus to racing in North America, to take on the full Michelin Endurance Cup schedule in LMP2 as part of the 2022 IMSA SportsCar Championship. The Team started off at the 2022 24 Hours of Daytona with 2 new drivers alongside Van Eerd and Van der Garde. IndyCar Race Winner Rinus VeeKay and young American prospect Dylan Murry. They would Qualify 14th overall and 7th in class in the Motul Pole Award 100, finishing 1 Lap down. In the race they had a great result finishing 6th overall and 2nd in class. In the next race at the 12 Hours of Sebring, Murry, Van der Garde and Van Eerd returned, with VeeKay not returning due to only being contracted for the Daytona 24. During qualifying at Sebring the team achieved secured a great starting position, ending up 12th overall and 3rd in class. In the race they finished on the LMP2 Podium, finishing 2nd in class and 8th overall, 1 Lap behind the winning PR1/Mathiasen Motorsports Entry and 7 Laps behind the leader. The team would not return until the Sahlen's Six Hours of the Glen, with the same 3 drivers as in Sebring. They would qualify 10th overall and 3rd in class. In the race they would finish 3rd and 10th overall finishing 2 laps behind the leader, Getting their second podium in a row and second podium of the season. The Team would finish 7th in the Teams Championship and 15th in the Drivers Championship.

=== Frits van Eerd controversy and selling to WRT ===
On 14 September 2023, the Dutch police found €176,000 in Frits van Eerd's house located in his safe, behind the door of his bedroom closet and in the fridge. 2 Days later they found another €448,000 at his office in Veghel. Van Eerd was forced to go to court, after which he sold his shares in Jumbo and all their Motorsport activities. After this, Racing Team Nederland was left without a main sponsor and subsequently withdrew from the World Endurance Championship and the IMSA SportsCar Championship, selling their assets to the Belgian team Team WRT who stayed in the WEC but did not participate in IMSA.

== Results ==
=== European Le Mans Series ===
Year	Class	Team	Chassis	Engine	Drivers	1	2	3	4	5	6	Pos.	Pts
2017	LMP2	Dayvtec Engineering	Dallara P217	Gibson GK428 4.2 V8	(Netherlands) Frits van Eerd (Netherlands) Jan Lammers	SIL; 11	MNZ; 10	RBR; 7	LEC; 12	SPA; 11	ALG; 8	17th	12.5

=== FIA World Endurance Championship ===
Year	Class	Team	Chassis	Engine	Drivers	1	2	3	4	5	6	7	8	Rank	Points
2018–19	LMP2	Dayvtec Engineering	Dallara P217	Gibson GK428 4.2 V8	(Netherlands) Frits van Eerd (Netherlands) Jan Lammers (Netherlands) Giedo van der Garde (Netherlands) Nyck de Vries	SPA; 7	LMS; 5	SIL; 5	FUJ; 7	SHA; 5	SEB; 5	SPA; 6	LMS; 6	6th	85
2019–20	LMP2	TDS Racing	Oreca 07	Gibson GK428 4.2 V8	(Netherlands) Frits van Eerd (Netherlands) Giedo van der Garde (Netherlands) Job van Uitert (Netherlands) Nyck de Vries	SIL; 3	FUJ; 1	SHA; 5	BHR; 5	COA; 5	SPA; 3	LMS; 6	BHR; 3	4th	130
2021	LMP2	TDS Racing	Oreca 07	Gibson GK428 4.2 V8	(Netherlands) Frits van Eerd (Netherlands) Giedo van der Garde (Netherlands) Job van Uitert (Netherlands) Nyck de Vries (France) Paul-Loup Chatin	SPA; 4	POR; 10	MNZ; 3	LMS; 6	BHR; 5	BHR; 6			6th	67

*Season in progress

=== 24 Hours of Le Mans ===
Year	Entrant	Team	No.	Car	Drivers	Class	Laps	Pos.	Class Pos.
2017	(Netherlands) Racing Team Nederland	Dayvtec Engineering	29	Dallara P217-Gibson	(Brazil) Rubens Barrichello (Netherlands) Frits van Eerd (Netherlands) Jan Lammers	LMP2	344	13rd	11th
2018	(Netherlands) Racing Team Nederland	Dayvtec Engineering	29	Dallara P217-Gibson	(Netherlands) Frits van Eerd (Netherlands) Giedo van der Garde (Netherlands) Jan Lammers	LMP2	356	11th	7th
2019	(Netherlands) Racing Team Nederland	Dayvtec Engineering	29	Dallara P217-Gibson	(Netherlands) Frits van Eerd (Netherlands) Giedo van der Garde (Netherlands) Nyck de Vries	LMP2	340	26th	15th
2020	(Netherlands) Racing Team Nederland	TDS Racing	29	Oreca 07-Gibson	(Netherlands) Frits van Eerd (Netherlands) Giedo van der Garde (Netherlands) Nyck de Vries	LMP2	349	19th	15th
2021	(Netherlands) Racing Team Nederland	TDS Racing	29	Oreca 07-Gibson	(Netherlands) Frits van Eerd (Netherlands) Giedo van der Garde (Netherlands) Job van Uitert	LMP2 (Pro-Am)	356	16th	2nd
