= PLUS (Dutch supermarket) =

Dutch supermarket chain

De Sperwer U.A.

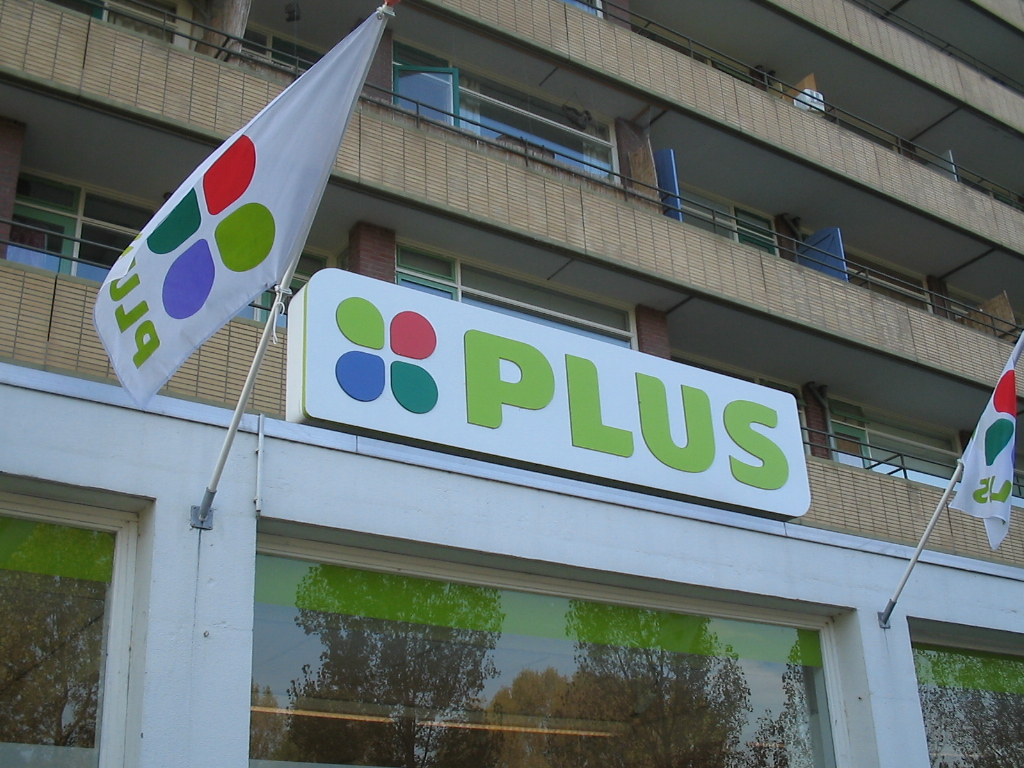
- Trade name: PLUS
- Formerly: Plusmarkt
- Type: Coöperatie uitsluiting van aansprakelijkheid (Co-operative society exempt from liability)
- Industry: Retailing
- Founded: 1988
- Headquarters: Utrecht, Netherlands
- Number of locations: 270 shops (2020)
- Area served: Netherlands
- Revenue: €2.61 billion (2019)
- Members: 259 shop owners (2020)
- Website: www.plus.nl

De Sperwer U.A., whose members trade as PLUS (Dutch pronunciation: [plʏs]) under licence from PLUS Holding B.V., is a Dutch co-operative supermarket chain headquartered in Utrecht. Its 259 members operate, as ‘independent entrepreneurs,’ 270 stores across the Netherlands. In 2019 the members had total revenues of €2.6 billion and an overall 6.5% share of the Dutch grocery market.

== History ==
The PLUS formula was created in 1988 as Plusmarkt, replacing De Sperwer's previous 4 = 6 supermarket chain. In 2001, Plusmarkt was rebranded as PLUS. Online shopping, with the option of home delivery or in-store collection, was introduced at some branches in 2015.

In 2006, as part of a consortium takeover with Sligro, De Sperwer purchased eighty branches of Edah from Laurus and converted them all to PLUS. De Sperwer also unsuccessfully attempted to take over Super de Boer and Emté in 2009 and 2018 respectively.

On 6 September 2021 it was announced the supermarket chains Plus and Coop have reached an agreement on a merger. The stores will continue under the name Plus, the name Coop will disappear. The combined organization is expected to become operational early next year. The merger was approved in December 2021 and completed in early 2022. However, it would take until 2024 for all Coop stores to be converted to PLUS.

== Operations ==
Stores operated under the PLUS brand are owned and operated by 259 ‘independent entrepreneurs’ who are all members of the De Sperwer co-operative. PLUS Holding B.V. licenses the PLUS formula to them and runs large-scale marketing campaigns on their behalf. The chain's market power is increased through membership of the Superunie purchasers’ co-operative. The PLUS organization has its headquarters in Utrecht. It also operates three national and three regional distribution centres.

== Awards ==
In a 2013 survey by MarketResponse, PLUS was named ‘most customer-friendly company in the Netherlands.’ It was also ‘most customer-friendly supermarket’ in the same survey in 2018 and 2019.

PLUS has scored highest among Dutch supermarkets in annual surveys by GfK several times: in the meat category each year from 2017 to 2019; in the bread category in 2019; in the corporate social responsibility category each year from 2015 to 2019; and in the wine category each year from 2013 to 2018.

== See also ==
- List of supermarket chains in the Netherlands
