= Job van Uitert =

Dutch racing driver

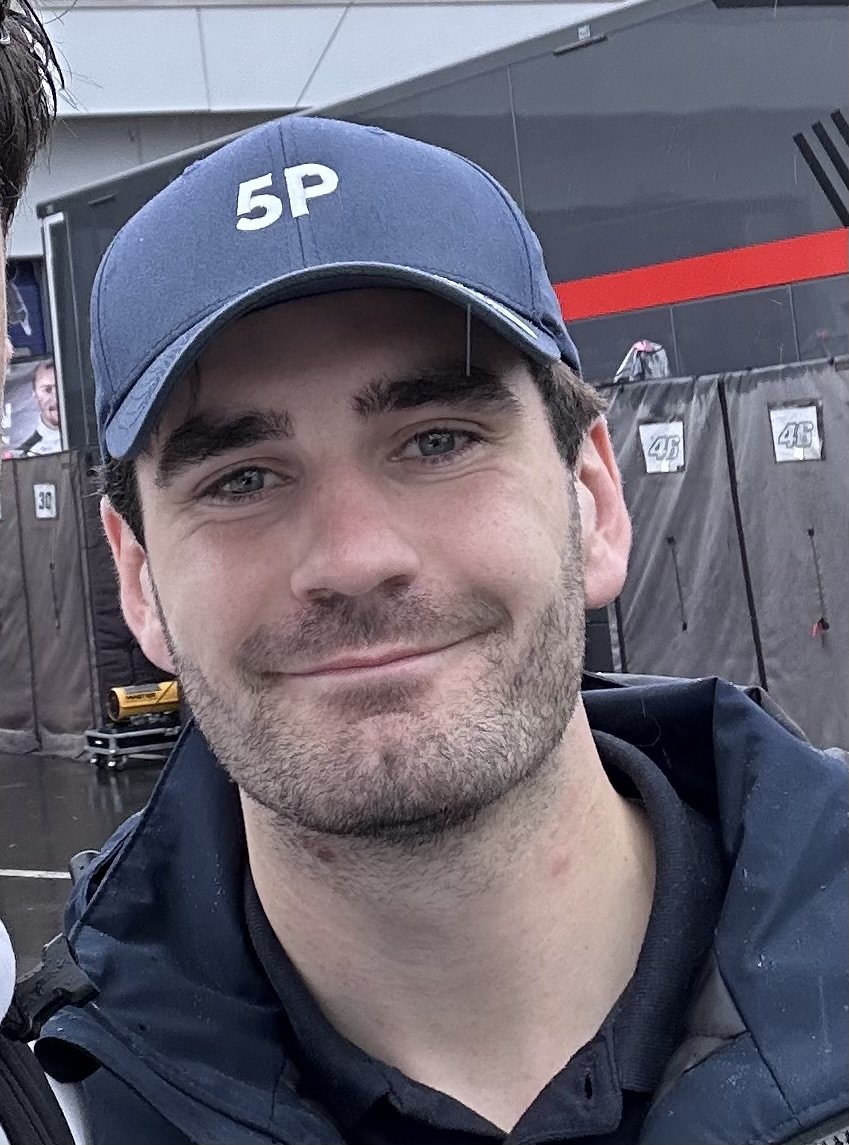
- Van Uitert in 2024
- Nationality: (Netherlands) Dutch
- Born: Jacobus van Uitert; 10 October 1998 (age 28) Dongen, North Brabant

European Le Mans Series career
- Debut season: 2018
- Current team: Panis Racing
- Categorisation: FIA Silver (until 2019); FIA Gold (2020–)
- Teams: RLR MSport, G-Drive Racing, United Autosports
- Starts: 28 (29 entries)
- Wins: 5
- Podiums: 13
- Poles: 2
- Fastest laps: 3
- Best finish: 1st (LMP3) in 2018

Previous series
- 2019-2021 2016-17 2015-17 2014: World Endurance Championship; Italian F4 Championship; ADAC Formula 4 Mazda MX-5 Cup Netherlands

Championship titles
- 2018: European Le Mans Series - LMP3

Jacobus "Job" van Uitert (born 10 October 1998) is a Dutch racing driver. He is currently racing in the LMP2 class of the European Le Mans Series with IDEC Sport.

== Early career ==
=== Beginnings and Mazda MX-5 Cup ===
Born in Dongen, and having come from a family of racing drivers, Van Uitert began racing in karts at the age of seven until pausing his career two years later due to his competitors benefitting from a high amount of "illegal equipment". He returned to racing in 2014, where he raced in the national Mazda MX-5 Cup. Having driven for Geva Racing, Van Uitert finished third in the standings.

=== Lower formulae ===
A move to single-seater racing was in order for the 2015 season, where Van Uitert would team up with Provily Racing for a campaign in the ADAC F4 Championship. As the lone entry of the team, Van Uitert struggled, failing to score any points throughout the year, ending up 33rd overall.

2016 would see Van Uitert moving to Jenzer Motorsport, for whom he would perform double-duties in the ADAC and Italian F4 series. His results improved markedly in the latter championship, where six podiums, including a pair of wins at Imola, meant that Van Uitert finished the year fourth in the standings despite missing the second event.

In 2017, Van Uitert remained with Jenzer in the category, this time electing to focus on the season in Italy. This would prove to be an inspired decision, as he was catapulted into a title battle with three podiums and a victory in Race 1 at Adria. Another win followed at Mugello, before Van Uitert once again ended up with three podiums in one event, taking two victories and one second place at the Imola Circuit. Having appeared on the rostrum three more times before the end of the season, Van Uitert ended his career in junior formulae as the runner-up of the Italian F4 Championship.

== Sportscar career ==
=== 2018: LMP3 Success ===
Van Uitert progressed to endurance racing for 2018, driving in the LMP3 category of the European Le Mans Series with RLR MSport. His start in the discipline proved to be successful, as he won his very first race in the category at the Circuit Paul Ricard, before going on to win once more in Spielberg. One more podium during a rain-shortened race at Spa-Francorchamps helped Van Uitert, along with teammates John Farano and Rob Garofall, clinch the title at the final round. As a result of his performances, Van Uitert was named the ELMS's Rookie of the Year.

=== 2019: Wins in LMP2 ===
A move up to LMP2 was on the cards for Van Uitert the following year, as he entered the ELMS as part of the G-Drive Racing outfit. A pair of victories in Monza and Barcelona put Van Uitert and teammate Roman Rusinov to the top of the standings after the opening half of the campaign. Despite finishing second in Silverstone and getting points in the final two races, the team would lose out on the title to IDEC Sport in the season finale, as Van Uitert received a penalty for causing a collision with the French team's driver Memo Rojas at Portimão, thus ending up a mere four points behind their rivals in the standings.

=== 2020: Repeated runner-up spot ===
For the 2020 European Le Mans Series, Van Uitert switched to United Autosports. The season began positively with a win at Le Castellet, although the team would have to stay content with a pair of top-ten finishes during the next two rounds. With another podium being scored at Monza, Van Uitert and his teammates Alex Brundle and Will Owen finished second in the championship, losing out to the sister United car one event before the end of the campaign.

=== 2021: Full season in WEC ===
Van Uitert would race in two series on a full-time basis during 2021, remaining with United Autosports in the ELMS on one hand and joining Racing Team Nederland for the Pro-Am Cup of the FIA World Endurance Championship on the other. The season in the former championship would prove to be disappointing, as Van Uitert was unable to finish any higher than third at Le Castellet, which left him twelfth in the drivers' standings. Meanwhile, having missed one round of the WEC, Van Uitert and Giedo van der Garde helped their amateur driver Frits van Eerd to clinch Pro-Am honours in the latter.

=== 2022: Consistent ELMS frontrunner ===
2022 saw Van Uitert team up with Julien Canal and Nico Jamin in the ELMS, driving for Panis Racing. The squad delivered a strong season, finishing every race in the top four positions, which included four podium finishes. As a result, Van Uitert and his teammates became vice-champions, missing out on the title to a dominant Prema Racing.

=== 2023: Further podiums ===
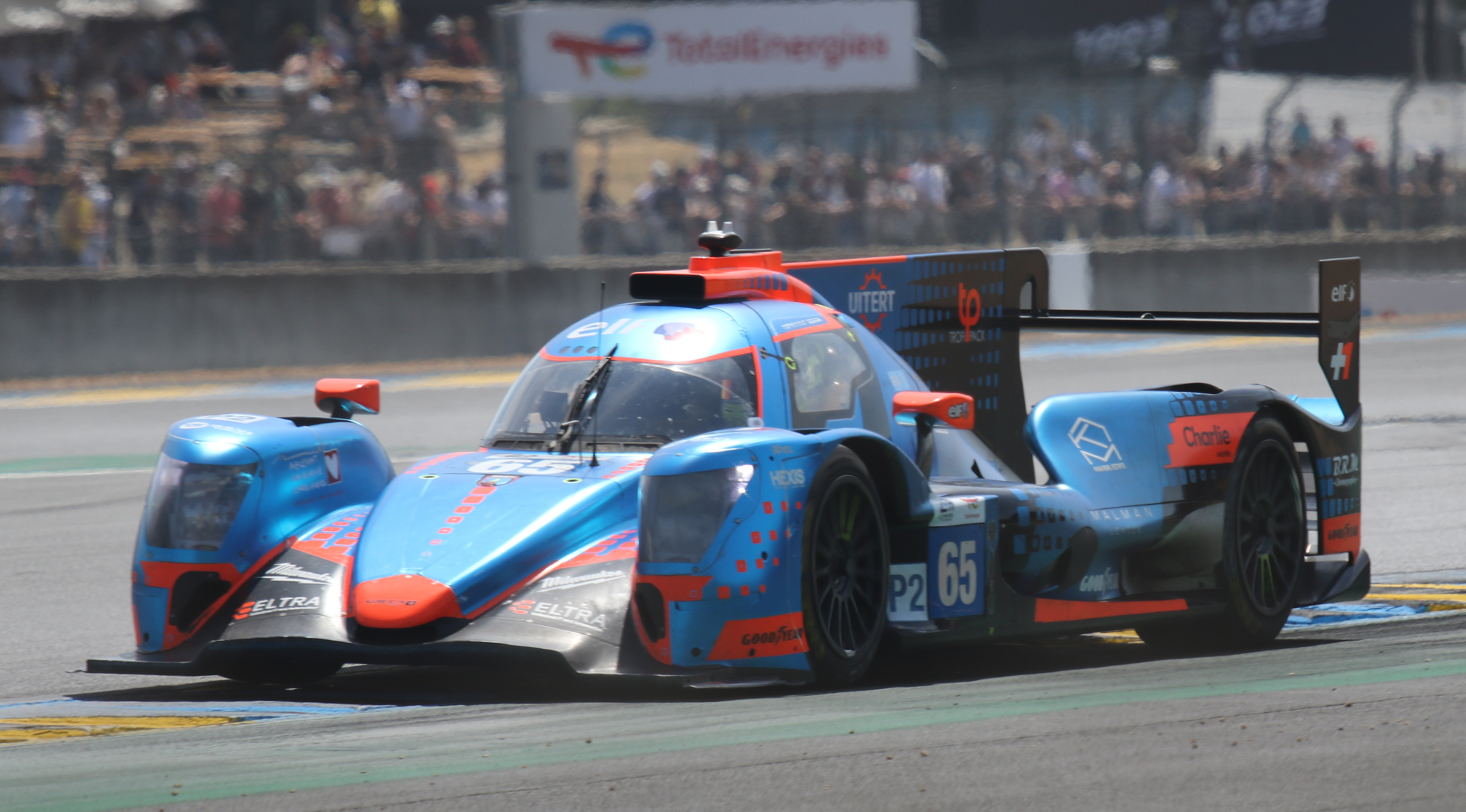
Van Uitert took 14th in the LMP2 class at the 2023 24 Hours of Le Mans

In 2023, Van Uitert reunited with Panis to race in the ELMS, partnering Tijmen van der Helm and Manuel Maldonado. A fifth place overall and third place in the pro class at Barcelona started off their campaign, before the team lost out on a chance of victory at Le Castellet when van der Helm was forced to pit from the lead due to a puncture. The race in Aragón showed promise too, as Van Uitert was leading at the start of the final hour, though a full-course yellow reset the race's rhythm, as he was passed by Paul-Loup Chatin and Alex Lynn, before losing a podium spot thanks to successful strategy of eventual race winners United Autosports. Drama followed in Spa, where Maldonado caused a four-car pileup at the start; despite a one-minute penalty incurred for the incident, Van Uitert and his teammates finished second in the pro category - and eighth overall. The final event in Portugal yielded a pair of third places - the second of which coming after Van Uitert recovered from being spun around by Neel Jani to end up narrowly missing out on second place, the Dutch driver having attempted a late dive down the inside of Alex Lynn's car. Van Uitert and his teammates finished third in the Pro class and fourth in the overall classification.

The trio also competed in the Le Mans 24 Hours, where they finished 14th in class.

=== 2024 ===
Following two years at Panis, Van Uitert signed on with IDEC Sport to drive alongside team regular Paul Lafargue and third-year LMP2 driver Reshad de Gerus. Additionally, he would make his GT3 debut by competing for Comtoyou Racing in the Bronze Cup class of the GT World Challenge Europe Endurance Cup.

== Racing record ==
=== Career summary ===
| Season | Series | Team | Races | Wins | Poles | F/Laps | Podiums | Points | Position |
|---|---|---|---|---|---|---|---|---|---|
| 2014 | Mazda MX-5 Cup Netherlands | Geva Racing | ? | ? | ? | ? | ? | 879 | **3rd** |
| 2015 | ADAC Formula 4 Championship | Provily Racing | 23 | 0 | 0 | 0 | 0 | 0 | 33rd |
| 2016 | ADAC Formula 4 Championship | Jenzer Motorsport | 24 | 0 | 0 | 0 | 0 | 19 | 20th |
| 2016 | Italian F4 Championship | Jenzer Motorsport | 18 | 2 | 0 | 3 | 6 | 143.5 | 4th |
| 2016 | Formula Ford Festival | | 1 | 0 | 0 | 0 | 0 | N/A | 12th |
| 2017 | ADAC Formula 4 Championship | Jenzer Motorsport | 3 | 0 | 0 | 0 | 0 | 0 | NC† |
| 2017 | Italian F4 Championship | Jenzer Motorsport | 21 | 4 | 2 | 4 | 10 | 247 | **2nd** |
| 2018 | European Le Mans Series - LMP3 | RLR MSport | 6 | 2 | 0 | 1 | 3 | 77.5 | **1st** |
| 2018 | Le Mans Cup - LMP3 | RLR MSport | 7 | 0 | 0 | 0 | 1 | 29.5 | 9th |
| 2019 | European Le Mans Series - LMP2 | G-Drive Racing | 6 | 2 | 0 | 1 | 3 | 101 | **2nd** |
| 2019 | 24 Hours of Le Mans - LMP2 | G-Drive Racing | 1 | 0 | 0 | 0 | 0 | N/A | 6th |
| 2019–20 | FIA World Endurance Championship - LMP2 | Racing Team Nederland | 2 | 0 | 0 | 0 | 0 | 16 | 18th |
| 2020 | European Le Mans Series - LMP2 | United Autosports | 5 | 1 | 1 | 1 | 2 | 70 | **2nd** |
| 2020 | 24 Hours of Le Mans - LMP2 | United Autosports | 1 | 0 | 0 | 1 | 0 | N/A | 13th |
| 2020 | IMSA SportsCar Championship - LMP2 | Tower Motorsport by Starworks | 1 | 1 | 0 | 0 | 1 | 35 | 14th |
| 2021 | FIA World Endurance Championship - LMP2 | Racing Team Nederland | 5 | 0 | 0 | 0 | 0 | 52 | 9th |
| 2021 | 24 Hours of Le Mans - LMP2 | Racing Team Nederland | 1 | 0 | 0 | 0 | 0 | N/A | 11th |
| 2021 | IMSA SportsCar Championship - LMP2 | Racing Team Nederland | 2 | 0 | 0 | 1 | 0 | 0 | NC |
| 2021 | European Le Mans Series - LMP2 | United Autosports | 5 | 0 | 0 | 0 | 1 | 28.5 | 12th |
| 2022 | European Le Mans Series - LMP2 | Panis Racing | 6 | 0 | 1 | 0 | 4 | 94 | **2nd** |
| 2022 | 24 Hours of Le Mans - LMP2 | Panis Racing | 1 | 0 | 0 | 0 | 0 | N/A | 12th |
| 2023 | IMSA SportsCar Championship - LMP2 | TDS Racing | 1 | 0 | 0 | 0 | 0 | 0 | NC |
| 2023 | European Le Mans Series - LMP2 | Panis Racing | 6 | 0 | 0 | 1 | 4 | 86 | **3rd** |
| 2023 | 24 Hours of Le Mans - LMP2 | Panis Racing | 1 | 0 | 0 | 0 | 0 | N/A | 14th |
| 2024 | European Le Mans Series - LMP2 | IDEC Sport | 6 | 0 | 1 | 0 | 1 | 50 | 6th |
| 2024 | 24 Hours of Le Mans - LMP2 | IDEC Sport | 1 | 0 | 0 | 0 | 1 | N/A | **3rd** |
| 2024 | GT World Challenge Europe Endurance Cup | Comtoyou Racing | 5 | 0 | 0 | 0 | 0 | 0 | NC |
| 2024 | GT World Challenge Europe Endurance Cup - Bronze | Comtoyou Racing | 1 | 0 | 0 | 0 | 1 | 15* | **3rd*** |
| 2024–25 | Asian Le Mans Series - LMP2 | DKR Engineering | 6 | 0 | 0 | 1 | 1 | 28 | 8th |
| 2025 | IMSA SportsCar Championship - LMP2 | Tower Motorsports | 1 | 0 | 0 | 0 | 0 | 209 | 58th |
| 2025 | European Le Mans Series - LMP2 | IDEC Sport | 6 | 0 | 0 | 0 | 0 | 40 | 8th |
| 2025 | 24 Hours of Le Mans - LMP2 | IDEC Sport | 1 | 0 | 0 | 0 | 0 | N/A | DNF |
| 2025 | GT World Challenge Europe Endurance Cup | Tresor Attempto Racing | 2 | 0 | 0 | 0 | 0 | 0 | NC |
| 2025 | European Endurance Prototype Cup | DB Autosport | 1 | 0 | 1 | 1 | 0 | 12 | 26th |
| 2026 | IMSA SportsCar Championship - LMP2 | Intersport Racing | 1 | 0 | 0 | 0 | 0 | 258 | 38th |
| 2026 | European Le Mans Series - LMP2 | IDEC Sport | 6 | 0 | 0 | 0 | 2 | 35 | 10th |
| 2026 | 24 Hours of Le Mans - LMP2 | IDEC Sport | 1 | 0 | 0 | 0 | 0 | N/A | 6th |

^{†} As Van Uitert was a guest driver, he was ineligible to score points.

=== Complete ADAC Formula 4 Championship results ===
(key)

| Year | Team | 1 | 2 | 3 | 4 | 5 | 6 | 7 | 8 | 9 | 10 | 11 | 12 | 13 | 14 | 15 | 16 | 17 | 18 | 19 | 20 | 21 | 22 | 23 | 24 | DC | Points |
|---|---|---|---|---|---|---|---|---|---|---|---|---|---|---|---|---|---|---|---|---|---|---|---|---|---|---|---|
| 2015 | Provily Racing | OSC1; 1; 21 | OSC1; 2; 20 | OSC1; 3; 20 | RBR; 1; 17 | RBR; 2 Ret | RBR; 3; 24 | SPA; 1; 16 | SPA; 2; 26 | SPA; 3; 22 | LAU; 1; 23 | LAU; 2; 20 | LAU; 3; 11 | NÜR; 1; 15 | NÜR; 2; 12 | NÜR; 3; 21 | SAC; 1 DNS | SAC; 2; 19 | SAC; 3; 21 | OSC2; 1 Ret | OSC2; 2 Ret | OSC2; 3; 22 | HOC; 1; 20 | HOC; 2; 12 | HOC; 3 Ret | 33rd | 0 |
| 2016 | Jenzer Motorsport | OSC1; 1 DSQ | OSC1; 2; 13 | OSC1; 3; 31 | SAC; 1; 20 | SAC; 2 Ret | SAC; 3; 29 | LAU; 1 Ret | LAU; 2; 12 | LAU; 3; 9 | OSC2; 1; 13 | OSC2; 2; 10 | OSC2; 3; 9 | RBR; 1; 31 | RBR; 2; 23 | RBR; 3; 17 | NÜR; 1; 30 | NÜR; 2; 19 | NÜR; 3; 23 | ZAN; 1; 13 | ZAN; 2 Ret | ZAN; 3; 13 | HOC; 1; 7 | HOC; 2; 14 | HOC; 3; 6 | 20th | 19 |
| 2017 | Jenzer Motorsport | OSC1; 1 | OSC1; 2 | OSC1; 3 | LAU; 1 | LAU; 2 | LAU; 3 | RBR; 1; 12 | RBR; 2 Ret | RBR; 3 Ret | OSC2; 1 | OSC2; 2 | OSC2; 3 | NÜR; 1 | NÜR; 2 | NÜR; 3 | SAC; 1 | SAC; 2 | SAC; 3 | HOC; 1 | HOC; 2 | HOC; 3 | | | | NC† | 0 |

^{†} As Van Uitert was a guest driver, he was ineligible to score points.

=== Complete Italian F4 Championship results ===
(key) (Races in bold indicate pole position; races in italics indicate fastest lap)

| Year | Team | 1 | 2 | 3 | 4 | 5 | 6 | 7 | 8 | 9 | 10 | 11 | 12 | 13 | 14 | 15 | 16 | 17 | 18 | 19 | 20 | 21 | 22 | 23 | Pos | Points |
|---|---|---|---|---|---|---|---|---|---|---|---|---|---|---|---|---|---|---|---|---|---|---|---|---|---|---|
| 2016 | Jenzer Motorsport | MIS; 1 | MIS; 2; 2 | MIS; 3; 3 | MIS; 4; 5 | ADR; 1 | ADR; 2 | ADR; 3 | ADR; 4 | IMO1; 1; 3 | IMO1; 2; 3 | IMO1; 3; 5 | MUG; 1; 10 | MUG; 2; 9 | MUG; 3; 4 | VLL; 1; 12 | VLL; 2; 13 | VLL; 3; 10 | IMO2; 1; 1 | IMO2; 2; 1 | IMO2; 3; 25 | MNZ; 1; 6 | MNZ; 2; 13 | MNZ; 3; 9 | 4th | 143.5 |
| 2017 | Jenzer Motorsport | MIS; 1; 6 | MIS; 2; 7 | MIS; 3; 6 | ADR; 1; 1 | ADR; 2; 2 | ADR; 3; 2 | VLL; 1; 5 | VLL; 2 Ret | VLL; 3 Ret | MUG1; 1 Ret | MUG1; 2 Ret | MUG1; 3; 1 | IMO; 1; 2 | **IMO**; **2**; 1 | **IMO**; **3**; 1 | MUG2; 1; 8 | MUG2; 2; 2 | MUG2; 3; 15 | MNZ; 1; 3 | MNZ; 2; 2 | MNZ; 3 Ret | | | 2nd | 247 |

=== Complete European Le Mans Series results ===
(key) (Races in bold indicate pole position; results in italics indicate fastest lap)

| Year | Entrant | Class | Chassis | Engine | 1 | 2 | 3 | 4 | 5 | 6 | Pos. | Points |
|---|---|---|---|---|---|---|---|---|---|---|---|---|
| 2018 | RLR Msport | LMP3 | Ligier JS P3 | Nissan VK50VE 5.0 L V8 | LEC; 1 | MNZ; 11 | RBR; 1 | SIL; 6 | SPA; 2‡ | ALG; 5 | 1st | 77.5 |
| 2019 | G-Drive Racing | LMP2 | Aurus 01 | Gibson GK428 4.2 L V8 | LEC; 4 | MNZ; 1 | CAT; 1 | SIL; 2 | SPA; 4 | ALG; 6 | 2nd | 101 |
| 2020 | United Autosports | LMP2 | Oreca 07 | Gibson GK428 4.2 L V8 | LEC; 1 | SPA; 5 | LEC; 8 | MNZ; 2 | **ALG**; 4 | | 2nd | 70 |
| 2021 | United Autosports | LMP2 | Oreca 07 | Gibson GK428 4.2 L V8 | CAT; 9 | RBR; 16 | LEC; 3 | MNZ; WD | SPA; 5 | ALG; 10 | 12th | 28.5 |
| 2022 | Panis Racing | LMP2 | Oreca 07 | Gibson GK428 4.2 L V8 | LEC; 3 | IMO; 4 | MNZ; 2 | CAT; 2 | SPA; 4 | ALG; 2 | 2nd | 94 |
| 2023 | Panis Racing | LMP2 | Oreca 07 | Gibson GK428 4.2 L V8 | CAT; 2 | LEC; 6 | ARA; 4 | SPA; 2 | POR; 3 | ALG; 3 | 3rd | 86 |
| 2024 | IDEC Sport | LMP2 | Oreca 07 | Gibson GK428 4.2 L V8 | CAT; 4 | **LEC**; 4 | IMO; 4 | SPA; 3 | MUG; Ret | ALG; 13 | 6th | 50 |
| 2025 | IDEC Sport | LMP2 | Oreca 07 | Gibson GK428 4.2 L V8 | CAT; 8 | LEC; 11 | IMO; Ret | SPA; 4 | SIL; 4 | ALG; 4 | 8th | 40 |
| 2026 | IDEC Sport | LMP2 | Oreca 07 | Gibson GK428 4.2 L V8 | CAT; 10 | LEC; 3 | IMO; 11 | SPA; 10 | SIL; 2 | ALG; Ret | 10th | 35 |

=== Complete FIA World Endurance Championship results ===
(key) (Races in bold indicate pole position; races in italics indicate fastest lap)

| Year | Entrant | Class | Chassis | Engine | 1 | 2 | 3 | 4 | 5 | 6 | 7 | 8 | Rank | Points |
|---|---|---|---|---|---|---|---|---|---|---|---|---|---|---|
| 2018-19 | G-Drive Racing | LMP2 | Aurus 01 | Gibson GK428 4.2 L V8 | SPA | LMS | SIL | FUJ | SHA | SEB | SPA; 2 | LMS; 6 | NC | 0 |
| 2019-20 | Racing Team Nederland | LMP2 | Oreca 07 | Gibson GK428 4.2 L V8 | **SIL**; 3 | FUJ | SHA | | | | | | 14th | 31 |
| 2019-20 | G-Drive Racing | LMP2 | Oreca 07 | Gibson GK428 4.2 L V8 | | | | BHR; 4 | COA | SPA | | | 14th | 31 |
| 2019-20 | United Autosports | LMP2 | Oreca 07 | Gibson GK428 4.2 L V8 | | | | | | | LMS; 13 | BHR | 14th | 31 |
| 2021 | Racing Team Nederland | LMP2 | Oreca 07 | Gibson GK428 4.2 L V8 | SPA; 4 | ALG; 10 | MNZ; WD | LMS; 11 | BHR; 5 | BHR; 6 | | | 9th | 52 |
| 2021 | Racing Team Nederland | Pro-Am Cup | Oreca 07 | Gibson GK428 4.2 L V8 | 1 | 4 | WD | 2 | 1 | 1 | | | 3rd | 142 |
| 2022 | Panis Racing | LMP2 | Oreca 07 | Gibson GK428 4.2 L V8 | SEB | SPA | LMS; 12 | MNZ | FUJ | BHR | | | NC† | 0 |

^{†} As Van Uitert was a guest driver, he was ineligible to score points.

=== Complete 24 Hours of Le Mans results ===
| Year | Team | Co-Drivers | Car | Class | Laps | Pos. | Class Pos. |
|---|---|---|---|---|---|---|---|
| 2019 | (Russia) G-Drive Racing | (Russia) Roman Rusinov (France) Jean-Éric Vergne | Oreca 07-Gibson | LMP2 | 364 | 11th | 6th |
| 2020 | (United States) United Autosports | (United Kingdom) Alex Brundle (United States) Will Owen | Oreca 07-Gibson | LMP2 | 359 | 17th | 13th |
| 2021 | (Netherlands) Racing Team Nederland | (Netherlands) Giedo van der Garde (Netherlands) Frits van Eerd | Oreca 07-Gibson | LMP2 | 356 | 16th | 11th |
| 2021 | (Netherlands) Racing Team Nederland | (Netherlands) Giedo van der Garde (Netherlands) Frits van Eerd | Oreca 07-Gibson | LMP2 Pro-Am | 356 | 16th | **2nd** |
| 2022 | (France) Panis Racing | (France) Julien Canal (France) Nico Jamin | Oreca 07-Gibson | LMP2 | 366 | 16th | 12th |
| 2023 | (France) Panis Racing | (Netherlands) Tijmen van der Helm (Venezuela) Manuel Maldonado | Oreca 07-Gibson | LMP2 | 316 | 25th | 14th |
| 2024 | (France) IDEC Sport | (France) Reshad de Gerus (France) Paul Lafargue | Oreca 07-Gibson | LMP2 | 297 | 17th | **3rd** |
| 2025 | (France) IDEC Sport | (Mexico) Sebastián Álvarez (France) Paul Lafargue | Oreca 07-Gibson | LMP2 | 308 | DNF | DNF |
| 2026 | (France) IDEC Sport | (France) Paul Lafargue (Italy) Valerio Rinicella | Oreca 07-Gibson | LMP2 | 359 | 20th | 6th |

=== Complete IMSA SportsCar Championship results ===
(key)

| Year | Team | Class | Make | Engine | 1 | 2 | 3 | 4 | 5 | 6 | 7 | Pos. | Points |
|---|---|---|---|---|---|---|---|---|---|---|---|---|---|
| 2020 | Tower Motorsport By Starworks | LMP2 | Oreca 07 | Gibson GK428 4.2 L V8 | DAY | SEB | ELK | ATL | PET; 1 | LGA | SEB | 14th | 35 |
| 2021 | Racing Team Nederland | LMP2 | Oreca 07 | Gibson GK428 4.2 L V8 | DAY; 8† | SEB | WGL | WGL | ELK | LGA | PET | NC† | 0† |
| 2023 | TDS Racing | LMP2 | Oreca 07 | Gibson GK428 4.2 L V8 | DAY; 4† | SEB | LGA | WGL | ELK | IMS | PET | NC† | 0† |
| 2026 | Intersport Racing | LMP2 | Oreca 07 | Gibson GK428 4.2 L V8 | DAY; 7 | SEB | WGL | MOS | ELK | IMS | PET | 7th* | 258* |

^{†} Points only counted towards the Michelin Endurance Cup, and not the overall LMP2 Championship.
^{*} Season still in progress.

=== Complete GT World Challenge Europe results ===
==== GT World Challenge Europe Endurance Cup ====
| Year | Team | Car | Class | 1 | 2 | 3 | 4 | 5 | 6 | 7 | Pos. | Points |
|---|---|---|---|---|---|---|---|---|---|---|---|---|
| 2024 | Comtoyou Racing | Aston Martin Vantage AMR GT3 Evo | Bronze | LEC; 24 | SPA; 6H; 18 | SPA; 12H; 33 | SPA; 24H; 20 | NÜR; Ret | | | 11th | 34 |
| 2024 | Comtoyou Racing | Aston Martin Vantage AMR GT3 Evo | Gold | | | | | | **MNZ**; 32 | JED; 35† | 10th | 31 |
| 2025 | Tresor Attempto Racing | Audi R8 LMS Evo II | Gold | LEC | MNZ | SPA; 6H | SPA; 12H | SPA; 24H | NÜR; Ret | CAT; Ret | NC | 0 |

=== Complete Asian Le Mans Series results ===
(key)

| Year | Team | Class | Car | Engine | 1 | 2 | 3 | 4 | 5 | 6 | Pos. | Points |
|---|---|---|---|---|---|---|---|---|---|---|---|---|
| 2024–25 | DKR Engineering | LMP2 | Oreca 07 | Gibson GK428 4.2 L V8 | SEP; 1; 7 | SEP; 2; 9 | DUB; 1; 2 | DUB; 2; 9 | ABU; 1 Ret | ABU; 2 Ret | 8th | 28 |
