= EkoPlaza =

Dutch supermarket chain

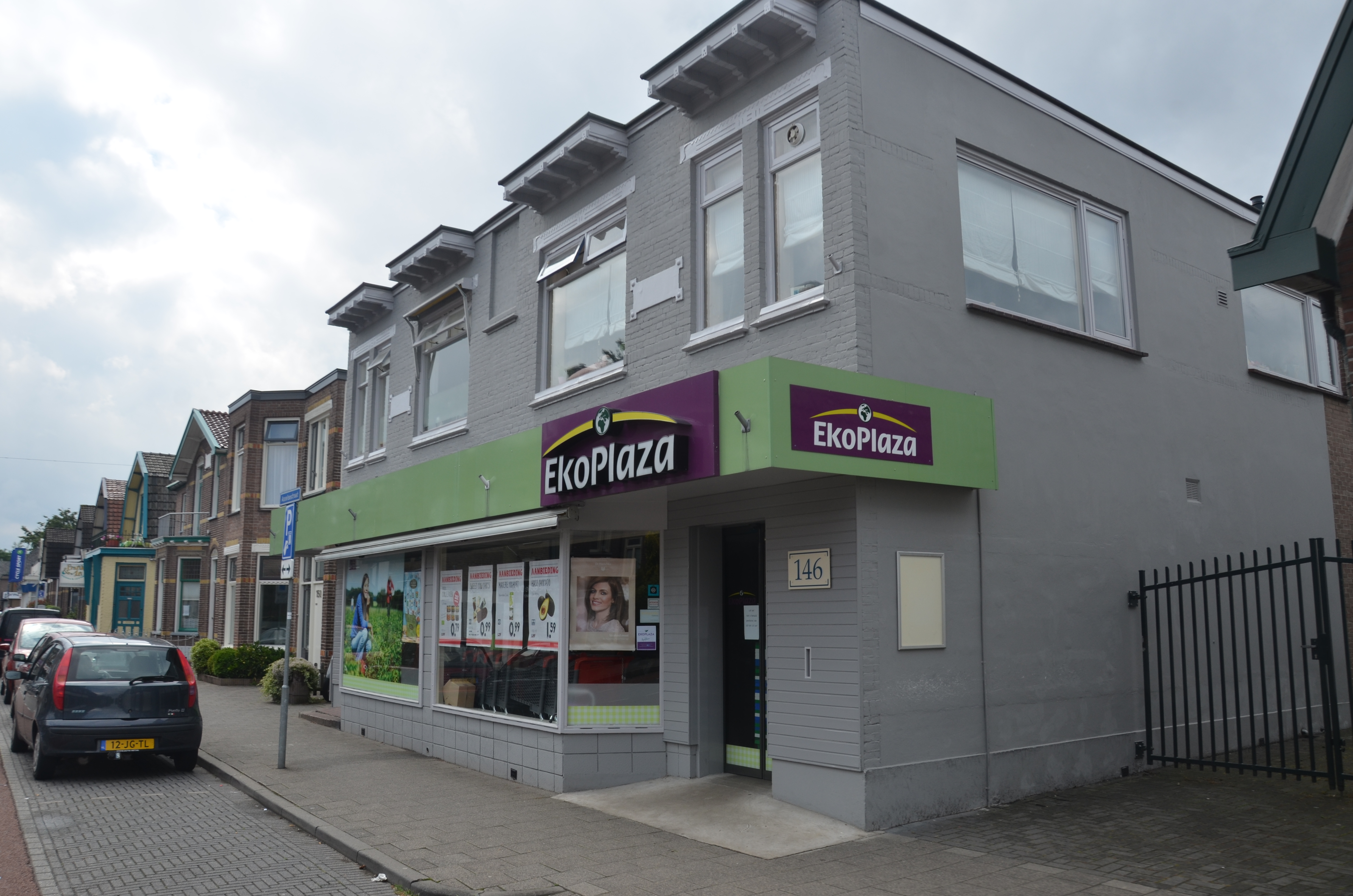
- EkoPlaza in Apeldoorn, 2015
- Industry: Grocery store
- Headquarters: Veghel, The Netherlands
- Number of locations: 74 (2018)
- Website: ekoplaza.nl

EkoPlaza (Dutch pronunciation: [eːkoːˈplaːzaː]) is a Dutch chain of organic food supermarkets.

As of February 2018, they have 74 supermarkets.

In February 2018, they launched the "world's first plastic-free aisle" at a branch in Amsterdam.
