= Coop (Netherlands) =

Dutch supermarket chain

- Industry: Retailing
- Founded: 1891
- Headquarters: Velp, Netherlands
- Number of locations: ▲242 (2015)
- Area served: Netherlands
- Products: Supermarkets
- Revenue: €1.7 billion (2020)
- Subsidiaries: See below
- Website: coop.nl

Coop Supermarkten is a supermarket chain founded in 1891 in Zaandam, Netherlands. It is named after the cooperative aspects of the company. In 2001, the company merged with wholesale purchaser Codis to form CoopCodis. In 2009, the name was changed again, from CoopCodis to Coop Supermarkten. Coop Supermarkten takes part in the Dutch wholesale purchasing cooperative Superunie.

In the last few years, the company launched a new type of store called Supercoop: these large stores are placed in areas where there is usually a lot of competition from other chains and they are seen as a response to the Dutch price war among supermarkets. With these new stores, the colours that the chain used were gradually changed from red and blue to orange, red and grey. The (new) logo is the store brand (Coop, Supercoop, or CoopCompact) in orange with a big red striking arc under it.

Their market share in 2013 was around 2.8 percent.

The company has a customer loyalty card, called "Coop Klantenkaart" in Dutch.

On 6 September 2021 it was announced the supermarket chains PLUS and Coop have reached an agreement on a merger. The stores will continue under the name Plus, the name Coop will disappear. The combined organization is expected to become operational early next year.

== Store brands ==
Coop Supermarkten is a cooperation of 242 supermarkets (on 2015-01-01):

- 36 price-aggressive large supermarkets under the name Supercoop, usually located in populated areas with a lot of competition.
- 60 smaller supermarkets under the name CoopCompact.
- Over 140 normal stores under the name Coop. A bit more expensive than their big brothers, these are usually located in rural areas where there is not a lot of competition.
- Several other stores, operated by franchisers under a different name (not using one of the Coop store formats).
