= Supercoop =

Former Dutch supermarket chain

- Type: Cooperative
- Industry: Retail
- Founded: 2001
- Headquarters: Velp, Netherlands
- Key people: F.R.G. Bosch (CEO)
- Products: Groceries
- Net income: ▲€ 24.8 million (2009)
- Number of employees: 4,343 (2010)
- Website: www.supercoop.nl

Supercoop is the name of a supermarket chain in the Netherlands. The first branches were opened in 2004 and by 2010 there were about 60 stores.

The Supercoop was one of the three formulas of parent company Coop, in addition to the regular supermarket Coop and the small (village) supermarket CoopCompact. The name SuperCoop was linked to large stores. They profiled themselves as price fighter. From 2011, Coop's policy changed and the Supercoop stores were closed. In 2024, the last branches were converted into a regular Coop supermarket.
