= Jumbo (supermarket) =

Dutch supermarket chain

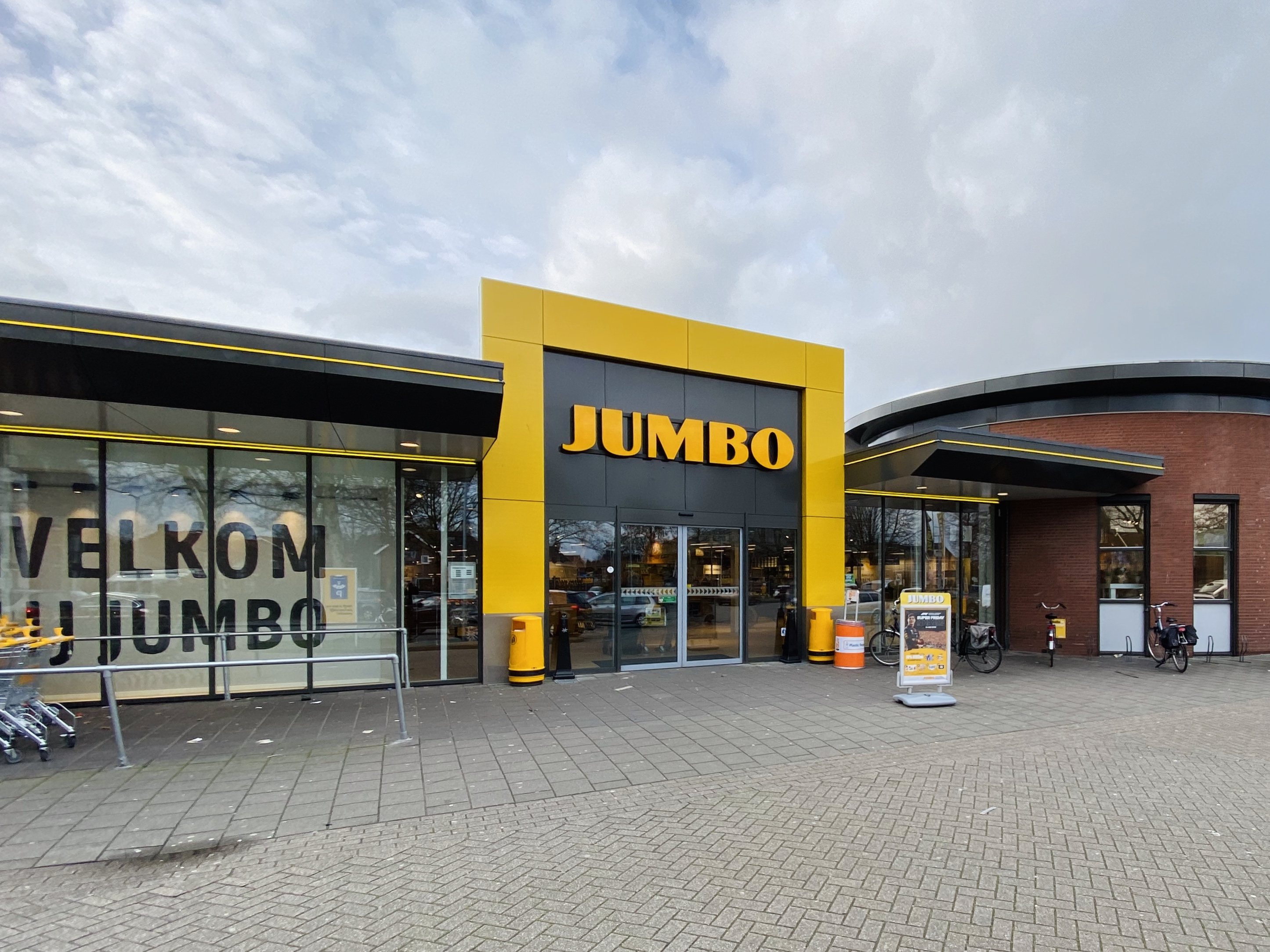
- Entrance of a Jumbo supermarket in Veghel
- Founded: 18 October 1979 in Tilburg, Netherlands
- Headquarters: Veghel, Netherlands
- Number of locations: 705 (2021)
- Area served: Netherlands, Belgium
- Products: Supermarkets
- Owner: Van Eerd Group
- Website: www.jumbo.com

Jumbo (Dutch pronunciation: [ˈjʏmboː]) is a supermarket chain in the Netherlands and Belgium. It is part of the privately owned Van Eerd Group. Van Eerd was originally a grocery wholesale company established in 1921. With 740 stores and a market share of about 22%, Jumbo is the second largest supermarket chain in the Netherlands, behind Albert Heijn.

== History ==
Logo as of 2010, including the supermarkten wordmark

On 18 October 1979, Jan and Anita Meurs opened the first Jumbo supermarket in a former church building in Tilburg. It was named after the elephant Jumbo as an act of one-upping the name of a local rival store called Torro, which belonged to Van Eerd. In 1983, Van Eerd bought the Jumbo store from the Meurs family and subsequently expanded, first in the southern provinces, then nationwide.

As of May 2006, 77 establishments have been opened throughout the Netherlands. Together, they have a market share of 3.4% in the Netherlands as of 1 January 2006. The head office and distribution centre are situated in Veghel. Jumbo has three regional distribution centres: Beilen, Drachten, and Den Bosch. With the opening of Jumbo in Valthermond, Drenthe in October 2005, there is a Jumbo in every province of the Netherlands. Until the acquisition of C1000, relatively few Jumbos were in the Randstad.

Wordmark of Konmar, a supermarket that was partially acquired by Jumbo in May 2006

In May 2006, Laurus (company) sold 12 of the Konmar supermarkets to Jumbo.

In September 2011, CVC announced that they would sell the C1000 supermarket chain. On 23 November 2011, it was announced that Jumbo would take over all C1000 stores. As a consequence, Jumbo became the second largest supermarket chain in the Netherlands, after Albert Heijn.

On 26 January 2016, Jumbo announced that it had acquired V&D's restaurant chain, La Place, out of bankruptcy for an undisclosed amount of money.

In March 2023, Jumbo announced Ton van Veen as the new CEO to replace Frits van Eerd. van Eerd stepped down as CEO in October 2022 after being investigated for money laundering.

== Sports sponsorship ==
On 23 October 2014, Jumbo announced it would be a major sponsor of the UCI World Tour professional cycling team, Belkin Pro Cycling, which became LottoNL–Jumbo and in 2019, Team Jumbo-Visma.

Jumbo has been sponsoring Max Verstappen since 2013 when Verstappen was racing in the Formula 3 European Championship and also sponsored Formula 2 and Formula E champion Nyck de Vries.

In 2017–2019, Jumbo was a major sponsor of Racing Team Nederland that entered the European Le Mans Series in 2017 and the FIA World Endurance Championship in 2018–2019 and 2019–2020.

In September 2022, company CEO Frits van Eerd was arrested amid ongoing investigations into money laundering that was carried out through real estate transactions, automotive trade and sponsorship in motocross. Jumbo commissioned an independent investigation into its sponsorship activities and found no criminal offenses or irregularities. Following the controversy, Jumbo announced in January 2023 that it will end most of their motorsport sponsorship but would continue to support Formula One World Champion Verstappen.

In June 2023, Jumbo announced that they would end the sponsorship deals with Verstappen and Team Jumbo-Visma after the current season. While the sponsorship for Team Jumbo-Visma will end in 2024, the company will be open for an early departure if the team is able to secure a new major sponsor. Jumbo will also no longer sponsor the Dutch Grand Prix. The decision to end all sports sponsorship is a part of new CEO Ton van Veen’s strategy for the company.

== Corporate social responsibility ==
In March 2024, Jumbo became the first Dutch supermarket to stop offering discounts and other special promotions on meat products. It also pledged that by 2030, 60% of its protein sales would be plant-based foods, including meat alternatives. The commitment was supported by public health, environmental, and vegan and animal welfare activists.
