= Albert Heijn =

Dutch supermarket chain owned by Ahold Delhaize

Albert Heijn B.V.
- Logo (2006–present)
- Industry: retail, retail chain
- Founded: 27 May 1887
- Founder: Albert Heijn
- Headquarters: Zaandam, Netherlands
- Number of locations: 1289
- Area served: Netherlands; Belgium
- Key people: Marit van Egmond (CEO)
- Products: Supermarkets, Convenience stores, Small hypermarkets
- Number of employees: 125,000
- Parent: Ahold Delhaize
- Website: Official website

Albert Heijn (Dutch pronunciation: [ˈɑlbərt ˈɦɛin]), often abbreviated to AH (pronounced [aːˈɦaː]) and informally to Appie (pronounced [ˈɑpi]), is the largest supermarket chain in the Netherlands with a market share of 37.7% in 2024. It was founded in 1887, and has been part of Ahold Delhaize since 2016.

== History ==
The chain was founded on 27 May 1887, when Albert Heijn bought a grocery store from his father Jan Heijn in Oostzaan. In the following years, Heijn opened other locations in several cities and in 1899, he opened a central warehouse in Zaandam.

From 1895, Heijn started roasting his own brand of coffee in a laundry room in his Oostzaan location and in 1910, several other self-produced items were added, including confectionery, cakes and pastry. Until 1913, these products were produced in an old town house in Zaandam, but the company built a professional factory on this spot in 1913.

In 1920, all enterprises were combined in the Maatschappij tot Exploitatie der Fabrieken en Handelszaken (Lit. "Society for the Exploitation of Factories and Businesses"). Anton Jurgens, one of the founders of Unilever, took a 50% share in the new company. These shares were bought back by the Heijn family in 1927. On 29 April 1920, Albert Heijn transferred control of the company to his sons Gerrit Heijn and Jan Heijn, and his son-in-law Johan Hille. Albert Heijn stayed on as president of the board.

Albert Heijn Sr. benefited from the industrialization that brought prosperity through fixed wages for factory workers and a new group of rich people. Eating habits changed: less in quantity but more and other types of items. Due to the rise of manufacturers and prepackaged items, indigenous and exclusive products came within reach.

The chain went public in 1948, and underwent two major changes in the 1950s. The first change was in 1952, with the introduction of their first self-service store and the second change was in 1955, with the opening of their first supermarket.

The chain could become the largest within the Netherlands via several acquisitions. Notable (partial) acquisitions were Van Amerongen (1950), Simon de Wit (1972) and C1000 (2008 and parts in 2012).

Ahold NV was founded on August 27, 1973, and Albert Heijn became part of it. The new construction made it easier for Albert Heijn's new parent company to enter the foreign market. In October of the same year, Etos was acquired, a number of stores were converted into Albert Heijn and the rest continued as a drugstore within Ahold.

At the beginning of 2003, Albert Heijn saw its market share fall sharply: 22.8 percent against 24.7 percent a year earlier. In order to win back customers and leave the expensive image behind, Albert Heijn decided to start a large-scale price reduction in the same year. The chain permanently reduced the price of thousands of items every so often.

At the end of 2006, managing director Dick Boer announced that Albert Heijn would stop lowering prices. The price difference with the competitors was successfully reduced by many percent. The market share was almost 30 percent at the end of 2006.

In 2007, the company crossed the ocean with the opening of a franchise store in Curaçao. This shop remained open until 2016, when it was changed to a different brand. The company entered the Belgian market in 2011, with the opening of a store in Brasschaat. Despite the merger of Ahold and Delhaize, Albert Heijn and Delhaize both remained active in Belgium. Currently Albert Heijn has 80 stores. After Curaçao and Belgium the company entered the German market with their AH To Go formula. This venture ended in 2018.

On October 11th, 2026, the Albert Heijn chain's IT systems were attacked, resulting in the shutdown of most of their externally-facing systems (including apps and websites), both in The Netherlands and Belgium. The attacks also severely disrupted their supply chains, resulting in empty shelves nationwide in The Netherlands and Belgium, for over a week.

=== Simon de Wit ===
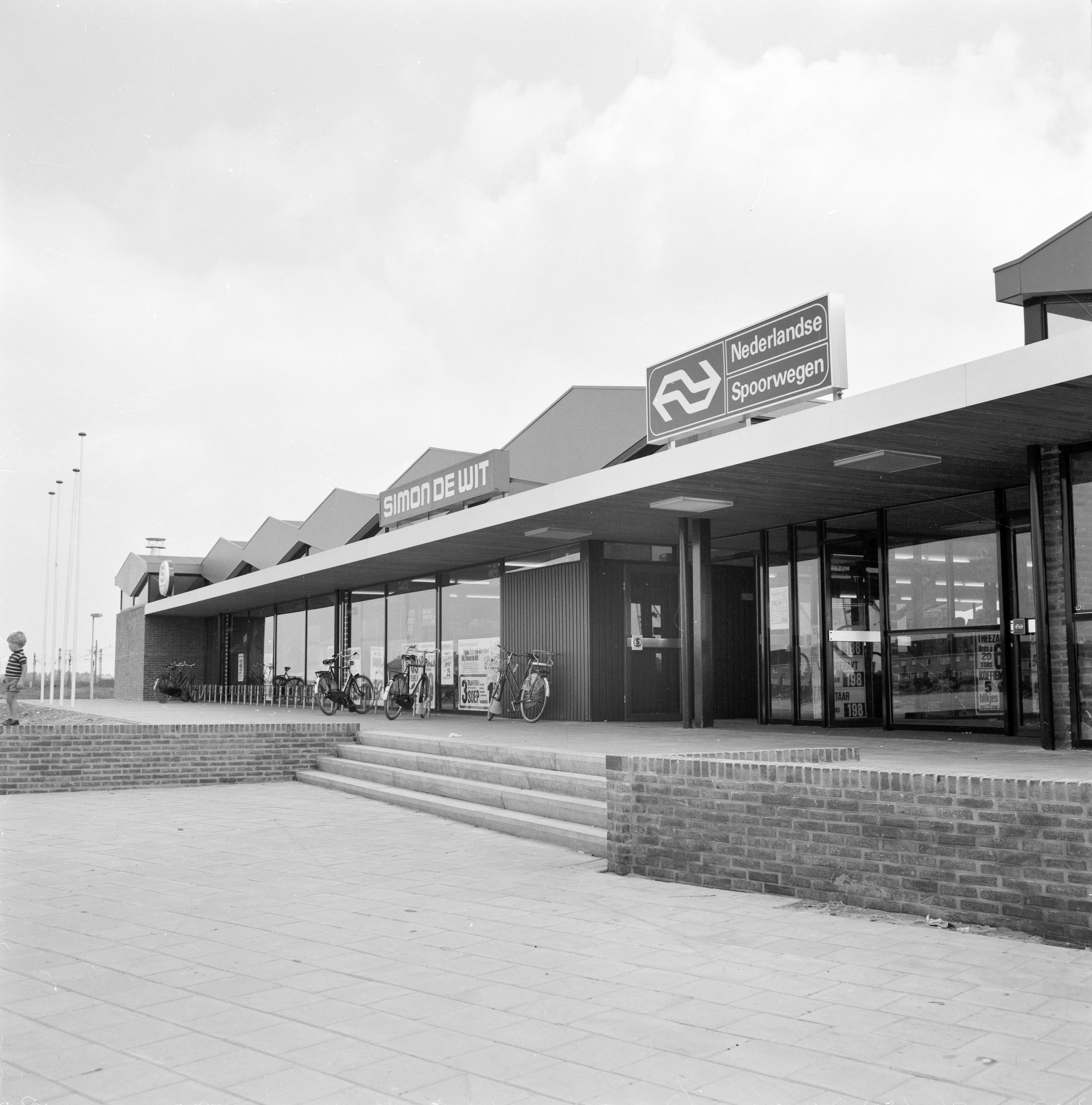
Simon de Wit Store in Heemskerk in 1969

Simon de Wit was a large family-owned chain of supermarkets in the Netherlands. The company was founded by Simon de Wit (1852–1934), who after his father's death in 1867 started a grocery store from his parental house in Wormerveer. In 1888 he opened the first branch in Amsterdam and by 1900 he ran stores at 30 different locations and owned a central warehouse in Zaandam.

In 1954 the opening of the 150th store was celebrated. In 1970, when Simon de Wit's grandson Simon was in charge, a fire destroyed the central warehouse in Zaandam. Soon after, Albert Heijn, which also originated in the Zaanstreek, showed interest in a takeover and in 1973 Simon de Wit merged with Albert Heijn, with all employees retaining their jobs. All remaining shops took on the name of the latter.

== Format ==
=== Albert Heijn ===
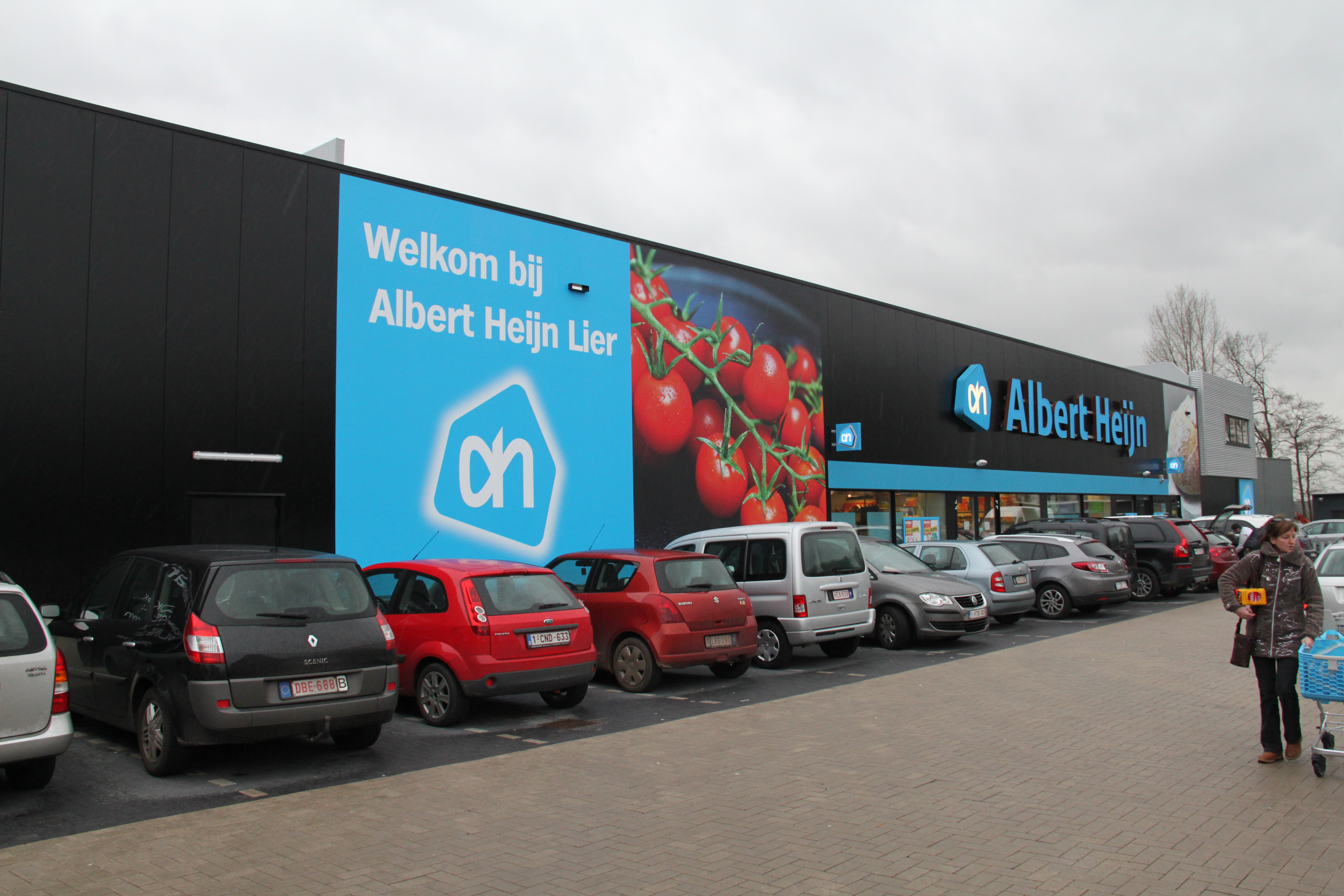
Albert Heijn in Lier

This format is most used throughout the Netherlands and Belgium and is their regular store format. Since 2018, the company began to roll out the concept Echt Vers (Really Fresh) in which the stores would be remodelled to offer 10–15% more fresh produce.

Albert Heijn also distinguishes itself by the steadily growing range of organic and ecological products, reducing the use of plastics and investing in sustainable construction and transport. The expansion of the sustainable range was brought under the umbrella brand "Puur & Eerlijk" in 2009, under the leadership of Dick Boer, with adjustments to stricter certification and change of packaging. The retail chain is also committed to reducing food waste.

=== AH To Go ===
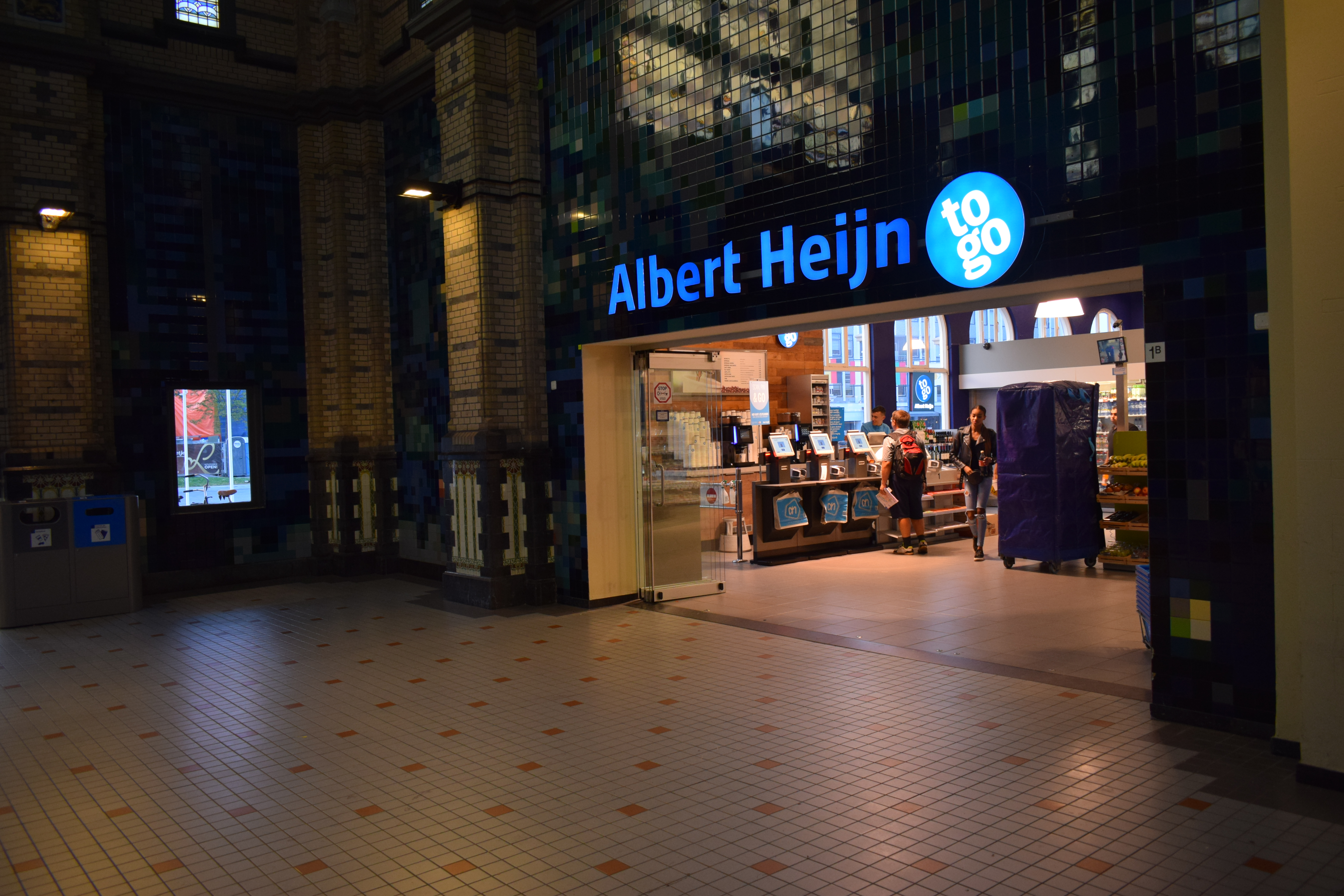
AH To Go at the Leeuwarden train station

In 1999, the chain developed a new format for a convenience store on request of the Nederlandse Spoorwegen, the railway company would become a franchisee and opened the first store on Station Den Bosch. The format got its current name in 2001, and specialises in products that customers need on their commute.

Since 2019, the company is testing a new version of the format without staff and cash registers. The customer scans their debit card and cameras register the customer and the items that are picked, after the customer leaves the right amount is deducted from their account. The new concept and technology was tested in a mobile unit that has been placed at the headquarters of Ahold Delhaize and Schiphol.

=== AH XL ===
Since 2002, the company operates several hypermarkets with a larger variety of products in both food and non-food. Within the store there are also several chefs preparing take-away. This kind of store usually occupies the whole floor.

=== Albert Heijn Online ===
The company started testing delivery in 1999, with the Albert Heijn Thuisservice, which was renamed Albert.nl in 2001. Via this channel customers could purchase their groceries, but also products from sister-companies Etos and Gall & Gall. The Albert brand was discontinued in 2014, and the delivery service was integrated in the Albert Heijn brand.

Former logo (1965–2006)

== Organisation and brand value ==
Since 1899, the chain is headquartered in Zaandam; their parent company is also located here. The chain operates six distribution centres in Nieuwegein, Geldermalsen, Zaandam, Tilburg, Pijnacker and Zwolle. In addition to a growing number of stores - both franchise and in-house - the chain also operates seven "Home Shop Centers" in Almere, Eindhoven, Rotterdam, De Meern, Amsterdam, Oosterhout and Bleiswijk.

The brand value of Albert Heijn was 866 million dollars in 2014, according to Trademark Office Interbrand. This put Albert Heijn in 26th place in the European brand values top 50.

== Sustainability ==
In 2024, Albert Heijn reported its methane emissions in its 2024 sustainability report, becoming the world's first retailer to publicly disclose its methane emissions. The company committed to a 45% emissions reduction by 2030 (compared to 2018 values), and net zero by 2050.

== See also ==
- Ahold as one of the merging partners of Ahold Delhaize
- List of supermarket chains in the Netherlands
- List of hypermarkets in the Netherlands
- Albert Czech Republic
