= C1000 =

Dutch supermarket chain

- Founded: Dokkum, Netherlands (1 April 1977)
- Defunct: 18 July 2015
- Successor: Jumbo
- Area served: Netherlands
- Products: Supermarkets, convenience stores
- Website: c1000.nl at the Wayback Machine (archived 2013-05-24)

C1000 was a Dutch supermarket chain. Founded on 1 April 1977, the chain had 500 stores in 2012, with a market share of 12.1%. The supermarket chain operated in a rather unusual manner for supermarkets in the Netherlands, using the franchise system.

C1000 often found itself in competition with Albert Heijn, the largest Dutch supermarket chain. Until 2008 however, C1000's parent company Schuitema was owned by Royal Ahold, Albert Heijn's parent company. In 2008 Ahold sold its shares to CVC Capital Partners. In September 2011, CVC announced that they were looking for a buyer for the company now renamed to C1000 BV. CVC received bids from several groups: Jumbo Supermarkten, Sligro Food Group, Edeka and Sperwer Group. On 23 November 2011, it was announced that Jumbo would take over the C1000 stores, with the exception of a select few that had to be sold to other groups due to competition regulations. Owing to the acquisition, Jumbo became the second-largest supermarket chain in the Netherlands, after Albert Heijn.

The C1000 formula was used by Jumbo Supermarkten until 2015 when C1000 shops were re-branded under the Jumbo formula; at the time there were still 252 supermarkets using the C1000 formula across the country.

== History ==
Wordmark of Schuitema N.V., the parent company of C1000 which was eventually also named C1000

=== First C1000 in Dokkum ===
Supermarket owner Germ Kloosterman from Dokkum experimented with the first C1000 in the year 1977. At the time there were many competitors in Dokkum, which is the reason why Germ Kloosterman wanted to set up a store that could compete with them by offering lower prices. His initial shop belonged to the Centra formula, which belonged to Schuitema, but he was allowed to try a new formula for a period of two years and if the results of his experiment were disappointing, he could return to the old formula.

The initial C1000 store was expanded from 100 square meters to 650 square meters by moving into the adjacent building. The store opened on 1 April 1977. Its name was derived from the term "Calculatie-1000" ("Calculation 1000"), which referred to the promotion of giving a fixed low price for a thousand items in the new store.

=== Expansion during the 1980s ===
A second pilot store was opened in Wolvega on 6 November 1980, but it wasn't until 1981 that the C1000-Voordeelmarkt formula was fully developed. Because the formula wasn't fully developed before 1981, this year is officially considered to be the founding year of C1000. Most new C1000-branded supermarkets were franchises.

== Products ==
As of 2012 C1000 had over 2000 different house brand products including both A-brand and B-brand products. C1000 issued magazines named Voordeelstraat and Voordeelplein which displayed the (temporarily) discounted and bargain products it was selling. Furthermore, at the beginning of every year C1000 would announce a hundred products that would cost €1,- for the duration of the year.

== C1000 Museum ==
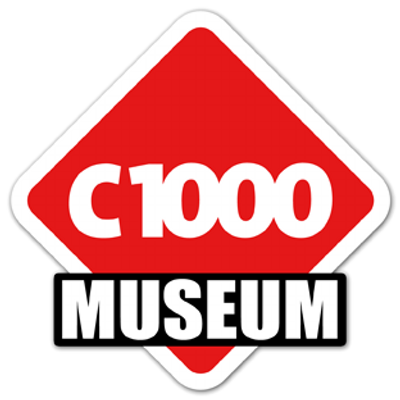
The logo of the C1000 Museum

It was reported in 2014 that a 22-year-old man named Gerard Marsman, who was a collector of C1000-related items and paraphernalia, wished to establish a museum dedicated to soon to disappear supermarket formula. Marsman was an employee of a C1000 since 2005, which was later rebranded as an Albert Heijn. His collection started when in 2006 he received a C1000 banner and by 2014 the entire attic and his bedroom of his parents' house were filled with C1000-related objects. In 2015 it was announced that he would open a museum dedicated to C1000 in the village of Hellendoorn, Overijssel. The collection of the museum includes products sold by the C1000, shopping bags, banners, clothing, and other articles. The museum opened on 17 December 2023.
