= Lists of shopping malls =

This is a list of lists of shopping malls and shopping centers by country. A shopping mall is one or more buildings forming a complex of shops representing merchandisers, with interconnecting walkways enabling visitors to walk from unit to unit. Other establishments including movie theaters and restaurants are also often included.

== Shopping malls ==
- Albania
- Algeria
- Angola
- Argentina
- Australia
  - Largest shopping centres in Australia
- Austria
- Azerbaijan
- Bahrain
- Bangladesh
- Belgium
- Bosnia and Herzegovina
- Brazil
- Bulgaria
- Cambodia
- Canada
  - Largest shopping malls in Canada
- Chile
- China
- Croatia
- Cyprus
- Czech Republic
- Denmark
- Egypt
- Estonia
- Finland
- France
- Germany
- Ghana
- Greece
- Hong Kong
- Hungary
- India
- Indonesia
- Iran
- Ireland
- Israel
- Italy
- Japan
- Kenya
- Kuwait
- Latvia
- Lebanon
- Lithuania
- Malaysia
- Malta
- Mexico
- Namibia
- Nepal
- New Zealand
- Nicaragua
- Nigeria
  - Largest shopping malls in Nigeria
- North Macedonia
- Norway
- Pakistan
- Peru
- Philippines
  - Largest shopping malls in the Philippines
- Poland
- Qatar
- Romania
- San Marino
- Saudi Arabia
- Serbia
- Singapore
- Slovakia
- South Africa
- Sweden
- Taiwan
- Thailand
  - Largest shopping malls in Thailand
- Turkey
- Ukraine
- United Arab Emirates
- United Kingdom
- United States
  - Largest shopping malls in the United States
- Venezuela
- Vietnam
- Zambia
- Zimbabwe

== See also ==
- List of buildings and structures
- List of largest shopping malls
- List of shopping streets and districts by city
- Category:Shopping malls by century of establishment for chronological listing
