= List of shopping malls in Ukraine =

This is a list of shopping malls in Ukraine listed by size.

== List ==
Name	Size	City	Opened in	Notes	Ref.
Blockbuster Mall	450 000 m^{2}	Kyiv	2019, 2021	Biggest mall in Kyiv, Ukraine and Europe	
Respublika Park	298 000 m^{2}	Kyiv	2021	Second biggest mall in Kyiv, Ukraine and Europe.	
Lavina Mall	170 300 m^{2}	Kyiv	2016		
Ocean Plaza	165 000 m^{2}	Kyiv	2012		
Planeta Mall	110 000 m^{2}	Kharkiv	2011	Formerly known as Magelan. Renovated in 2022.	
Nikolsky	106 000 m^{2}	Kharkiv	2021	Most known Kharkiv mall. One of the biggest malls in Ukraine.	
King Cross Leopolis	105 000 m^{2}	Lviv	2010	Biggest mall in Lviv.	
Victoria Gardens	102 000 m^{2}	Lviv	2016		
Karavan Megastore	100 000 m^{2}	Dnipro	2008	Biggest mall in Dnipro.	
Sky Mall	90 500 m^{2}	Kyiv	2010		
Karavan	85 000 m^{2}	Kharkiv	2006	Formerly known as Karavan Megastore. Renovated in 2021. Shelled by Russia in 2022.	
Riviera Shopping City	82 000 m^{2}	Odesa	2009	Shelled by Russia in 2022.	
Musson	80 000 m^{2}	Sevastopol	2006	Biggest mall in Sevastopol. Located at temporarily occupied territory.	
Dream Berry	80 000 m^{2}	Kyiv	2009	Formerly known as Dream Town 1.	
Dream Yellow	80 000 m^{2}	Kyiv	2010	Formerly known as Dream Town 2.	
Port City	78 800 m^{2}	Mariupol	2013	Shelled by Russia in 2022. Located at temporarily occupied territory.	
Forum Lviv	70 735 m^{2}	Lviv	2015		
MOST City Center	68 300 m^{2}	Dnipro	2006	Also used as residence and offices.	
Dafi	60 000 m^{2}	Kharkiv	2008		
GlobalUA	60 000 m^{2}	Zhytomyr	2008	Biggest mall in Zhytomyr.	
Karavan Outlet	58 000 m^{2}	Kyiv	2003	Formerly known as Karavan Megastore. Renovated in 2019.	
Hollywood	53 000 m^{2}	Chernihiv	2015	Biggest mall in Chernihiv.	
Apollo	50 000 m^{2}	Dnipro	2009		
Donetsk City	42 000 m^{2}	Donetsk	2006	Also used as offices. Biggest mall in Donetsk. Located at temporarily occupied territory.	
Globus	35 500 m^{2}	Kyiv	2001		
Soniachna Halereia	34 000 m^{2}	Kryvyi Rih	2008	Biggest mall in Kryvyi Rih.	
Pryozernyi	31 800 m^{2}	Dnipro	2009		
Prospekt SEC (ТРК Проспект)	30 900 m^{2}	Kyiv	2019		
Victory Plaza	30 000 m^{2}	Kryvyi Rih	2006		
Avrora	27 200 m^{2}	Zaporizhzhia	2013	Biggest mall in Zaporizhzhia. Shelled by Russia in 2022.	
Lubava	26 000 m^{2}	Cherkasy	2013	Biggest mall in Cherkasy.	
Passage	25 100 m^{2}	Dnipro	2011		
Neo Plaza	24 700 m^{2}	Dnipro	2006	Formerly known as Materyk. Renovated in 2019.	
Kontynent	23 197 m^{2}	Donetsk	2009	Located at temporarily occupied territory.	
Terra	23 000 m^{2}	Kryvyi Rih	2012		
City Mall	23 400 m^{2}	Zaporizhzhia	2011		
Ukraina	22 000 m^{2}	Zaporizhzhia	1963	Renovated in 2004.	
Sea Mall	20 000 m^{2}	Sevastopol	2012	Located at temporarily occupied territory.	
DEPO't Center	19 000 m^{2}	Cherkasy	2016		
Lavanda Mall	19 000 m^{2}	Sevastopol	2019	Located at temporarily occupied territory.	
DEPO't Center	18 500 m^{2}	Chernivtsi	2009	Biggest mall in Chernivtsi.	
Miriada	18 400 m^{2}	Dnipro	2007		
TsUM Chernihiv	18 330 m^{2}	Chernihiv	1975	Formerly known as Druzhba and Megacenter. Renovated in 2003 and 2019.	
Dafi	18 000 m^{2}	Dnipro	2005		
Dnipro Plaza	18 000 m^{2}	Cherkasy	2008		
Nasha Pravda	18 000 m^{2}	Dnipro	2013		
Maidan	15 500 m^{2}	Chernivtsi	2003		
Prospekt	14 528 m^{2}	Chernivtsi	2016		
Royal	13 000 m^{2}	Chernihiv	2010		
Zolotoe Koltso	11 000 m^{2}	Donetsk	2004	Located at temporarily occupied territory.	
Terra	10 725 m^{2}	Kamianske	2008		
Budynok Torhivli	10 000 m^{2}	Cherkasy	1979	Renovated in 2020.	
Plazma	10 000 m^{2}	Cherkasy	2006		
Apelsin	10 000 m^{2}	Sevastopol	2012	Located at temporarily occupied territory.	

== Links ==
- (in Ukrainian) The most visited shopping malls in Ukraine forbes.net.ua, November 6, 2012
- (in Ukrainian) Newbuilding in Ukraine vn.com.ua, December 24, 2021
