= List of shopping malls in Nigeria =

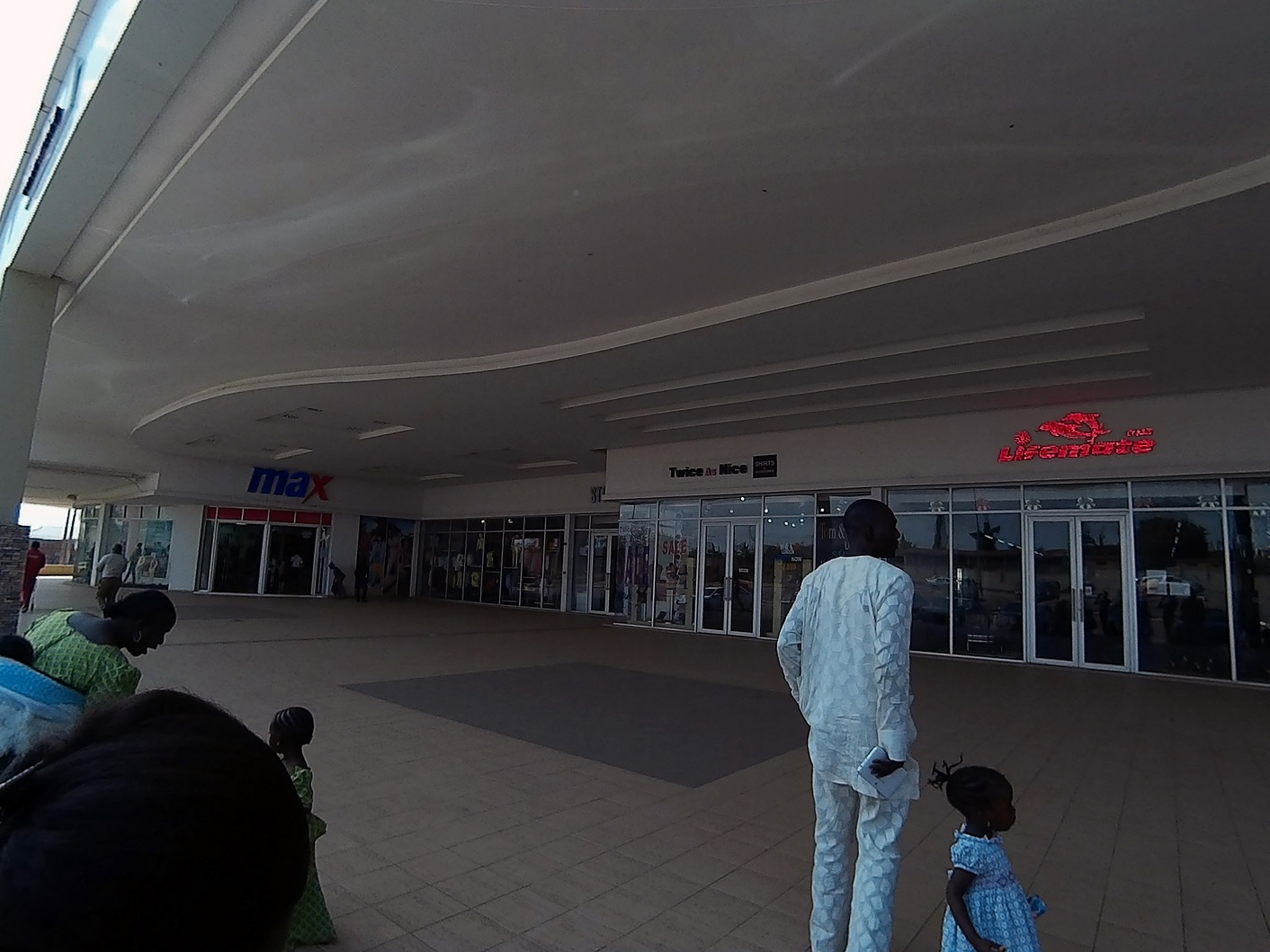
Palms Mall, in Ilorin, Kwara

== Abia ==
- Aba Mega Mall (opened on May 27, 2015) – set to be the biggest mall in Africa; has the unique distinction of being the first and only smart mall in the world; Phase one was commissioned by former Governor Theodore Orji

== Enugu ==
- Polo Park Mall (opened on September 15, 2011)

== Federal Capital Territory ==
- Silverbird Entertainment Centre (opened in 2009)

== Kano ==
- Ado Bayero Mall (opened on March 20, 2014) – developed by the Alpine Group of Africa, it is the largest mall in Northern Nigeria. The mall is managed by Beyond Squarefeet.

== Lagos ==
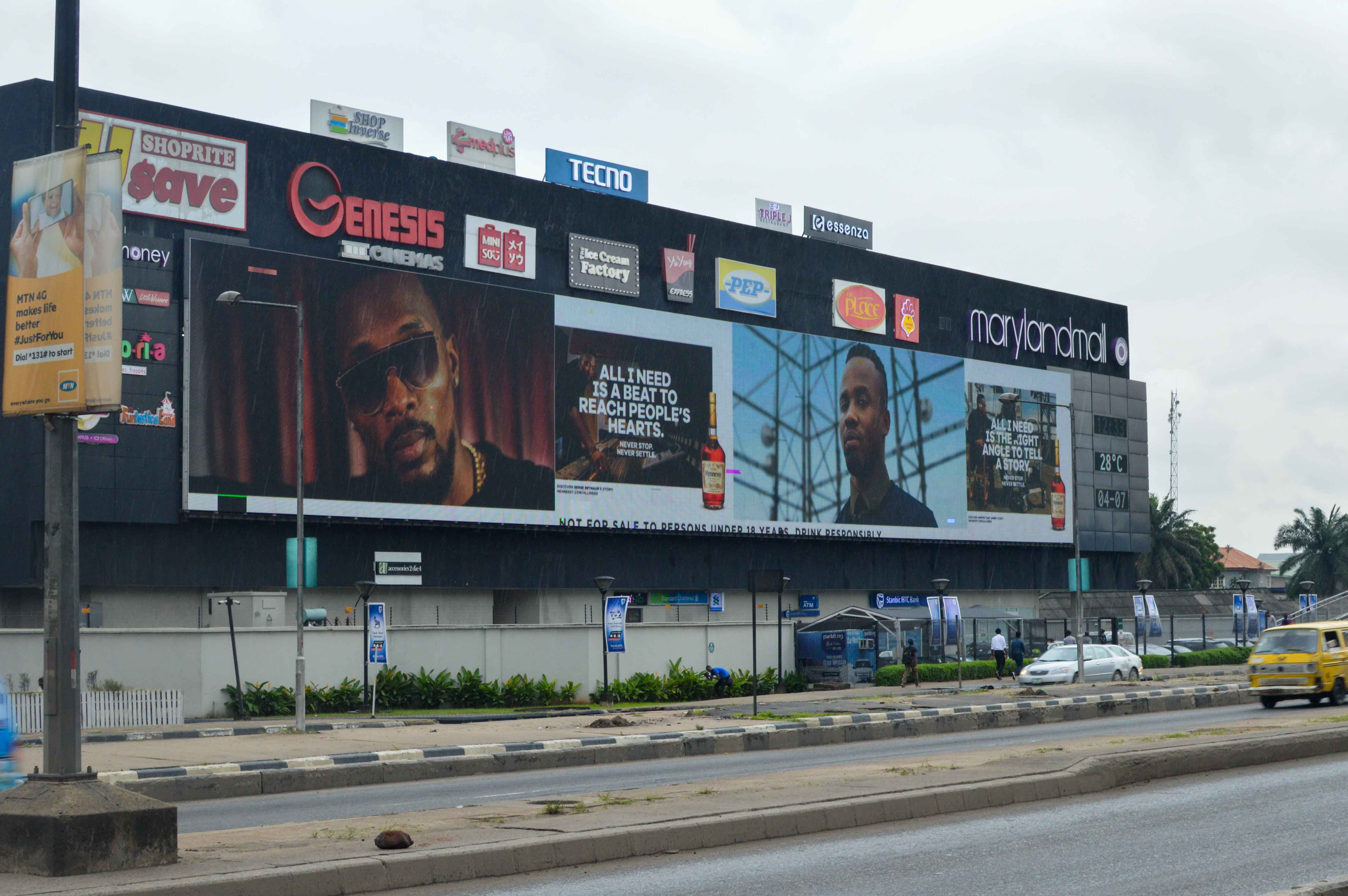
Maryland mall

- Ikeja City Mall
- Palms Shopping Mall

== Osun ==
- Osun Mall is located at the old Fakunle Comprehensive High School, along Gbongan – Osogbo Road in Osogbo, Osun State. It is an ultramodern, mega shopping mall in the capital of Osun. It has a lot of segments that offer different types of services, such as Filmhouse cinema, spas, game shops, bars, restaurants, and many variety stores. It has a lot of packing spaces, and a large compound for events. It was commissioned by then governor of Osun Ogbeni Rauf Adesoji Aregbesola in 2018.

== See also ==
- List of largest shopping malls in Nigeria
- List of largest shopping malls in the world
