= List of shopping malls in Croatia =

This is a list of shopping malls in Croatia.

== Zagreb ==
- Arena Centar (2010)
- Avenue Mall (2007)
- Bakar Mall (2004)
- Branimir Center (2003)
- Cascade Centar (closed)
- City Center One East
- City Center One West (2006)
- Cvjetni Prolaz (2011)
- Garden Mall
- Importanne Center (1994)
- Importanne Galleria (1999)
- Kaptol Centar (2000)
- King Cross (2002)
- Mandi (2007)
- Mercatone Emmezeta (2000)
- Mercator Centar (2000, sold and renamed to Super Konzum Radnička)
- Point Shopping Center, Vrbani
- Phoenix Plaza (Sesvete) (2011)
- Prečko Shopping Center (1995)
- Supernova (2012)
- Westgate Shopping City, Zaprešić (2009)

=== Sveta Helena ===
- Outlet Center Sveta Helena (closed)

=== Sveta Nedelja ===
- Hoto Centar (2008)

=== Sveti Križ Začretje ===
- Roses Fashion Outlet

== Split ==
- City Center One (2010)
- Joker Centar (2007)
- Kaufland Centar (2003)
- Konzum Centar Sirobuja (2010)
- Mall of Split (2015)
- Mercator Centar Solin (2002)
- Prima 3 Centar (2005)
- TC Kaštela Kaštel Sućurac (2004)

== Rijeka ==
- Mercator Centar (2007)
- Tower Center Rijeka (2006)
- ZTC-Shopping (2012)

== Osijek ==
- Avenue Mall (2011)
- Esseker Centar (2007)
- Eurodom (2011)
- Interspar (2007)
- Mercator Centar (2004)
- Portanova (2011)

== Zadar ==
- Callegro (2008)
- City Galleria (2002)
- Mercator Centar (2005)
- Supernova (2010)

== Sisak ==
- Interspar (2007)
- Kaufland (2004)
- Nama (1974)
- Supernova (2009)

== Slavonski Brod ==
- City Colosseum (2013)
- Supernova (2007)

== Varaždin ==
- City Point (2012)
- Lumini (2011)
- Supernova (2009)

== Šibenik ==
- Dalmare (2004)
- City Life
- Supernova (2011)

== Dubrovnik ==
- Sub City Srebreno (2015)

== Poreč ==
- Riva Mall
- Galerija Poreč

== Makarska ==
- Shopping center sv.Nikola
- Capitol Park (2014)
- Shopping center Merces
- Spot Mall (2020)
