= Bhat-Bhateni Supermarket =

Supermarket chain in Nepal

Bhat-Bhateni Super Market
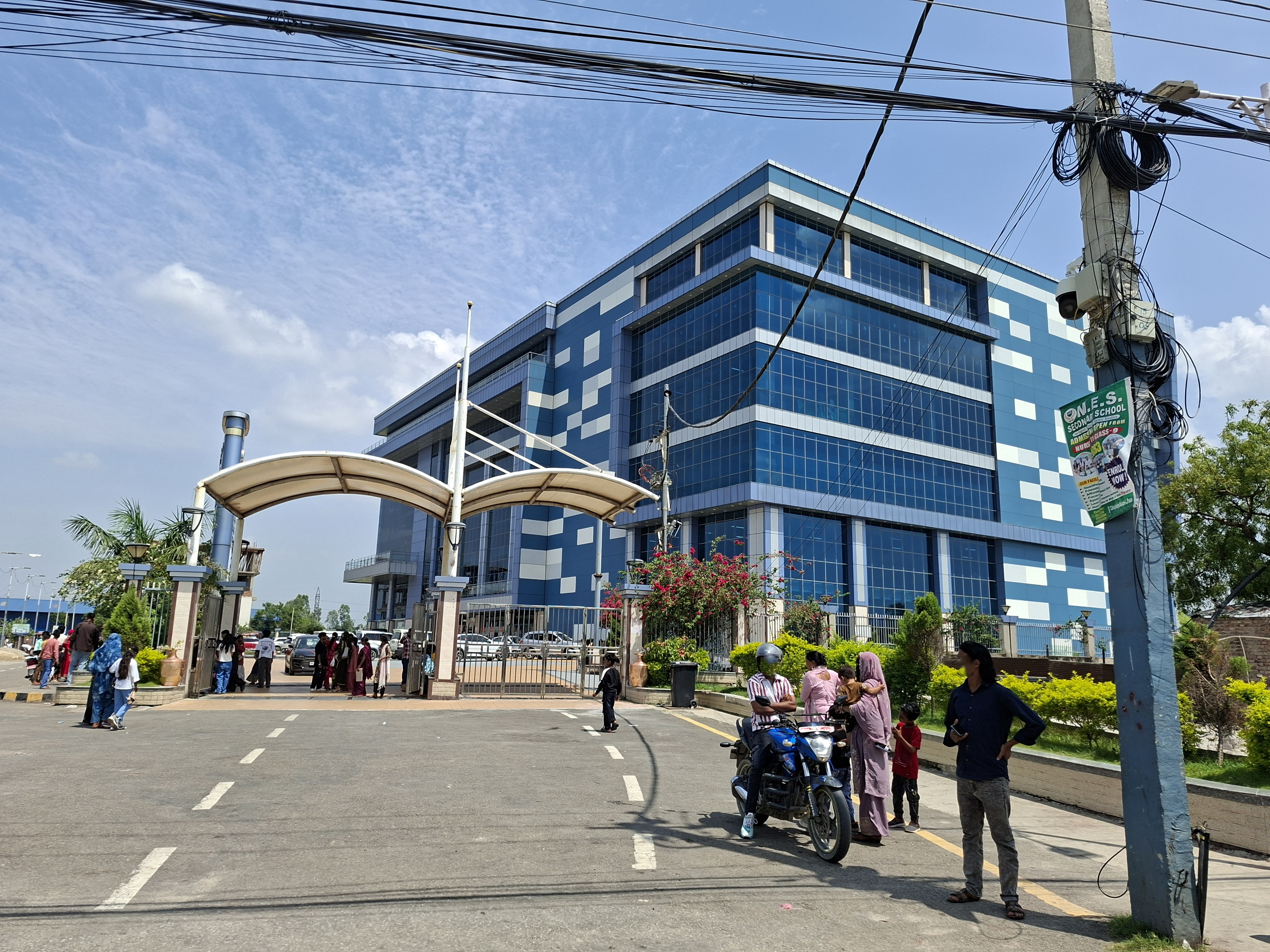
- Bhat-Bhateni, BIrgunj
- Native name: भाट-भटेनी सुपर मार्केट
- Type: Retail
- Founded: 11 October 1984; 41 years ago
- Founder: Min Bahadur Gurung
- Headquarters: Bhatbhateni Kathmandu, Nepal
- Number of locations: 27
- Key people: Min Bahadur Gurung(Chairman); Panu D. Poudel (COO)
- Revenue: NPR 32 billion
- Number of employees: 22,000+
- Website: www.bbsm.com.np

Bhat-Bhateni Super Market (BBSM, Nepali: भाट-भटेनी सुपर मार्केट) is the biggest retail supermarket chain of Nepal. The first store was opened in Bhat-Bhateni, Kathmandu in 1984 by Min Bahadur Gurung. It was opened with an investment of NPR 35,000 near Bhat Bhateni Temple at Naxal from where it derives its name.

The chain has stores in 29 locations; thirteen inside the Kathmandu Valley and sixteen elsewhere. It employs more than 22,000 employees, with daily sales exceeding NRs 5.5 Crore (US$550,000.00). Bhat-Bhateni is also the largest taxpayer in the retail sector in Nepal.

== Stores ==
The chain has stores in the following locations:

An "*" denotes under construction

=== Inside valley (Sorted by Districts) ===
==== Kathmandu ====
- Bhat-Bhateni
- Maharajganj
- Tokha
- Koteshwor
- Chuchepati
- Anamnagar
- Balaju
- Kalanki
- Tripureshwor

==== Lalitpur ====
- Krishna Galli
- Satdobato
- Sanagaun

==== Bhaktapur ====
- Thimi

=== Outside valley (Sorted by Province) ===
==== Bagmati ====
- Bharatpur
- Tandi*
- Hetauda

==== Gandaki ====
- Pokhara (New Road)
- Tal Chowk*

==== Koshi ====
- Dharan
- Itahari
- Biratnagar
- Birtamod
- Damak

==== Madesh ====
- Janakpur
- Birgunj

==== Lumbini ====
- Nepalgunj
- Butwal
- Bhairahawa

==== Sudurpaschim ====
- Dhangadhi

It also owns a warehouse in Baluwatar, Kathmandu.

== Incidents ==
9 September 2025: Bhat-Bhateni Supermarket had suffered heavy losses during the gen z protest that damaged around two thirds of its outlets and completely burned down a dozen of them. It has also been reported that dead bodies were found in some of its stores. Due to the incident, a lot of its outlets are still under reconstruction and closed for the moment.

== Controversies ==
The store has been accused of tax evasions and blackmarketing multiple times.

- The administration sentenced for imprisonment on Bhat-Bhateni Super Market for selling products at a higher rate in 2020 in Chitwan and Kathmandu.
- A tax evasion case was filed against the supermarket by Inland Revenue Department (IRD) for avoiding value-added tax (VAT) worth NPR 90 million by making fake bills.

== See also ==
- List of shopping malls in Nepal
- Lalitpur City F.C.
