= List of shopping malls in Latvia =

This is a list of shopping malls in Latvia

== Malls in Latvia ==
As of 2024, Latvia had at least 20 malls.

Malls in Latvia
| Name | Location | Opened | Mall website | Owner | Number of stores | Size (Leasable area), square metres |
|---|---|---|---|---|---|---|
| Akropole Rīga | Riga | 2019 | Akropole Riga website | Akropolis Group, UAB | 190 | 97,000 (71,000) |
| Akropole Alfa | Riga | 2001 | Akropole Alfa website | Akropolis Group, UAB | 200 | 154,000 (71,000) |
| Domina | Riga | 2003 | Domina website | SIA EfTEN DOMINA | 163 | 110,000 (42,000) |
| Spice | Riga | 2001 | Spice website | E.L.L. Real Estate (Merko Group) | 156 | 77,600 (41,019) |
| Plaza | Riga | 2009 | Plaza website | New Century Holding, Plaza Centers Europe | 140 | 90,000 / 67,000 (49,000) |
| Galerija Centrs | Riga | 2006 | Galerija Centrs website | Baltic Horizon Fund | 110 | 32,000 (20,000) |
| Mols | Riga | 1998 | Mols website | SIA F 8 | 130 | 32,800 (29,000) / 35,000 (24,600) |
| Galleria Riga | Riga | 2010 | Galleria Riga website | Acacia | 79 | |
| Origo | Riga | 2003 | Origo website | Linstow Center Management | >200 | 81 800 m2 |
| Stockmann | Riga | 2011 | Stockmann website | Stockmann | department store | 11,000 |
| Galerija Azur (closed permanently) | Riga | 2006 | Galerija Azur website | Meinl European Land Ltd | 58 | 25,000 / 27,000 |
| Elkor Plaza | Riga | 2006 | Elkor Plaza website | Elkor | department store | 25,000 |
| Sky and More | Riga | 2007 | Sky and More website | | 99 | 16,000 |
| Podium | Riga | 1999 | Podium website | Elkor | department store | |
| Solo | Daugavpils | 2004 | Solo website | LMT Retail & Logistics SIA | 63 | |
| Ditton Nams | Daugavpils | | Ditton Nams website | Ditton Group | unknown | 46,500 (to be expanded to 60,000) |
| XL Sala | Liepaja | | | Akciju sabiedrība LPB | <35 | 11,700 |
| Kurzeme | Liepaja | 2008 | Kurzeme website | SIA Lielās ielas centrs | ~40 | 9,287 |
| Baata | Liepaja | 2009 | Baata website | Hiponia | 24 / >30 | 7,710 / 8,000 |
| Pilsētas pasāža | Jelgava | 2006 | Pilsētas pasāža website | SIA Marno J | 43 / 42 | 22,350 |
| Tobago | Ventspils | | | SIA TC Tobago | | 8,591 |
| Valleta | Valmiera | 2007 | Valleta website | SIA VRPB | 64 / 70 | 16,500 (9,500) |
