= List of largest shopping malls in Nigeria =

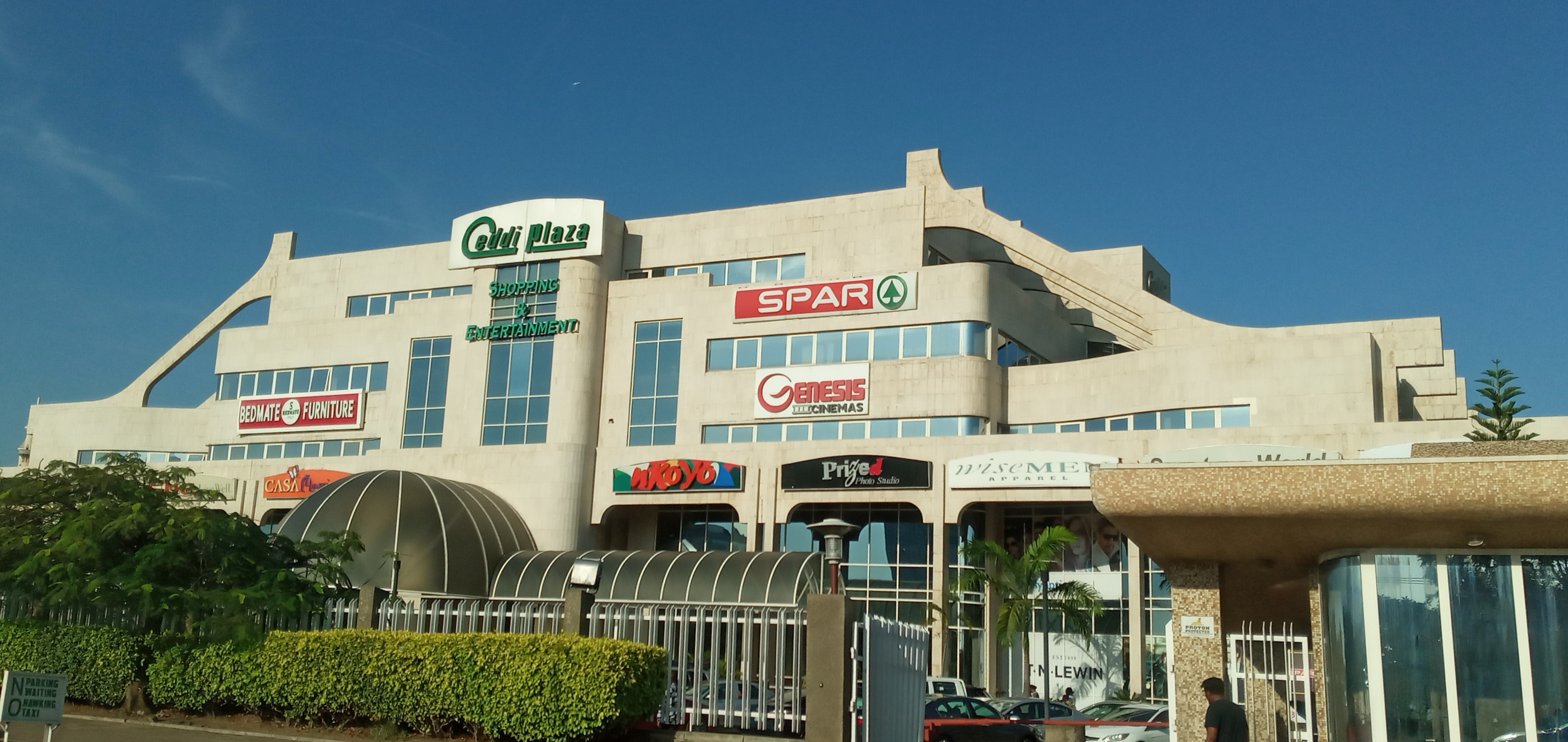
Ceddi Plaza shopping mall ABJ

This article lists shopping malls in Nigeria with a gross leasable area of at least 10,000 square meters. The shopping centres which are operational or under construction are listed below.

Further information can be found here.

== Malls by gross leasable area ==
Construction ongoing

#	Mall	Location	Gross leasable area m² (ft²)	Year opened	stores	Anchor stores	Primary stakeholder	Notes
1	Tinapa Shopping Centre	Calabar, Cross River	80,000 m^{2} (861,113 ft^{2})	2007			Tinapa Business Resort Limited	
2	Capital Mall	Abuja, FCT	40,000 m^{2} (430,556 ft^{2})	Under construction		N/A	Churchgate Group	
3	Jabi Lake Mall	Abuja, FCT	26,479 m^{2} (285,017 ft^{2})	2015		Game, Shoprite	Actis / Duval Properties	
4	Ado Bayero Mall	Kano, Kano	24,136 m^{2} (259797.7 ft^{2})	2014		Shoprite, Game, Filmhouse Cinemas	Beverly Development & Realties Ltd	
5	Silverbird Entertainment Centre	Abuja, FCT	23,000 m^{2} (247,570 ft^{2})	2009		Silverbird, Shoprite	Silverbird Group	
6	Ikeja City Mall	Ikeja, Lagos	22,645 m^{2} (243,749 ft^{2})	2011		Shoprite, Silverbird	Gruppo Investment	
7	Polo Park Mall	Enugu, Enugu	22,530 m^{2} (242,511 ft^{2})	2011		Game, Shoprite, Hub Media, Max	Persianas Group	
7	Novare Lekki Mall	Lekki, Lagos	22,530 m^{2} (242,511 ft^{2})	2016		Game, Shoprite	Novare Private Partners	
9	Palms Shopping Mall	Lekki, Lagos	19,520 m^{2} (210,112 ft^{2})	2005		Game, Shoprite, Hub Media, Genesis Deluxe Cinemas	Persianas Group	
10	Ibadan Mall	ibadan, Oyo	18,500 m^{2} (199,132 ft^{2})	2014		Shoprite	Persianas Group	
11	Port Harcourt Mall	Port Harcourt, Rivers	16,000 m^{2} (172,223 ft^{2})	2014		Spar, Park 'n Shop	Artee Group	
12	Delta City Mall	Effurun, Delta	13,980 m^{2} (150,479 ft^{2})	2015		Shoprite, Mr Price, Jet	Resilient Africa	
13	Benin City Mall	Benin, Edo	13,300 m^{2} (143,160 ft^{2})	Under construction		Shoprite	Resilient Africa	
14	Onitsha Mall	Onitsha, Anambra	12,100 m^{2} (130,243 ft^{2})	2016		Shoprite, Mr Price, Woolworths	African Capital Alliance	
15	Palms Mall	Ilorin, kwara	12,000 m^{2} (129,167 ft^{2})	2012		Shoprite, Hub Media	Persianas Group	
16	Abia Mall	Umuahia, Abia	11,000 m^{2} (118,403 ft^{2})	Under construction		Shoprite	Abia Mall Retail Company	
17	Festival Mall	Lagos, Lagos	10,900 m^{2} (117,327 ft^{2})	2015		Shoprite, Hub Media	UAC Property	
18	Circle Mall	Lekki, Lagos	10,539 m^{2} (113,440 ft^{2}	2015		Shoprite, Wrangler, Swatch, TM Lewin	RMB Westport	
19	Ceddi Plaza	Abuja, FCT	10,000 m^{2} (107,630 ft^{2})	2004		Silverbird, Spar, Park 'n Shop	Ceddi Corporation	

== See also ==
- List of largest shopping malls in the world
- List of shopping malls in Nigeria
