= Portanova =

Portanova may refer to:

== People ==
- Gennaro Portanova (1845–1908), Italian Catholic cardinal
- Germán Portanova (born 1973), Argentine football player and manager
- Daniele Portanova (born 1978), Italian football player
- Manolo Portanova (born 2000), Italian football player; son of Daniele Portanova

== Places ==
- Portanova (Casal Cermelli), a civil parish of the commune of Casal Cermelli in the Province of Alessandria, Italy

== Other ==
- Portanova (Osijek), a shopping center in Osijek, Croatia
- Porta Nova (Volterra), a city gate of the commune of Volterra, in Tuscany, Italy

== See also ==
- Porta Nuova (disambiguation)
