= Porta Nuova =

Porta Nuova may refer to:

== Italy ==
=== Railway stations ===
- Torino Porta Nuova railway station, the main railway station of Turin
  - Porta Nuova (Turin Metro), a rapid transit station
- Pescara Porta Nuova railway station
- Verona Porta Nuova railway station

=== City gates ===
- Archi di Porta Nuova, Milan
  - Porta Nuova (Milan), a business district
- Porta Nuova (Palermo)
- Porta Nuova, in Caravaggio, Italy
- Porta Nuova, in Grosseto
- Porta Nuova, in Verona, designed by Michele Sanmicheli

== See also ==
- Portanova (disambiguation)
