= List of supermarket chains in Slovakia =

This is a list of supermarket chains in Slovakia.

== Supermarkets and hypermarkets ==
Name	Stores	First store in Slovakia	Parent	Store types	Website
Biedronka	15	2025	(Portugal) Jeronimo Martins	Discount supermarket	http://www.biedronka.sk/
Billa	165	1996	(Germany) REWE Group	Supermarket	http://www.billa.sk/
COOP Jednota	2300	2002	(Slovakia) Coop Jednota Slovensko	Supermarket, Grocery store	http://www.coop.sk/
Fresh	34 (own), 650 (franchise)	2003	(Slovakia) Labaš s.r.o.	Supermarket, Grocery store	http://www.freshobchod.sk/
Kaufland	80	2000	(Germany) Schwarz Gruppe	Hypermarket	http://www.kaufland.sk/
Kraj	32	2018	(Slovakia) J&T	Health food store	http://www.krajpotravin.sk/
Lidl	164	2004	(Germany) Schwarz Gruppe	Discount supermarket	http://www.lidl.sk/
Metro C&C	6	2000	(Germany) Metro AG	Cash and carry	http://www.metro.sk/
Terno	125	2000	(Slovakia) J&T	Supermarket, Grocery store	http://velkoobchod.terno.sk//
Yeme	6	2016	(Slovakia) Slovenský potravinársky priemysel	Health food store	http://www.yeme.sk/

== Other grocery chain stores ==
- (Hungary) CBA (with divisions: CBA Verex, GVP, Karmen, KoMaCo, Komfos, Nitrazdroj a.s.(28 stores), Sintra, PT)
- (Slovakia) Klas
- (Slovakia) Koruna
- (Slovakia) Milk-Agro
- (Germany) Môj Obchod (franchise concept operated by Metro Cash & Carry)

== Convenience stores ==
- (Slovakia) Delia
- (Slovakia) Malina

== Home improvement/do it yourself ==
- (Germany) Bauhaus
- (Germany) Hornbach
- (Slovakia) Kinekus
- (Poland) Merkury Market
- (Germany) Obi

== Furniture stores ==
- (Germany) Asko
- (Slovakia) Decodom
- (Sweden) IKEA
- (Slovakia) Kondela
- (Austria) Möbelix
- (Germany) Sconto
- (Austria) XXXLutz

== Consumer electronics ==
- (Netherlands) Euronics
- (Slovakia) Nay
- (Czech Republic) Okay
- (Czech Republic) Planeo
- (Czech Republic) Alza

== See also ==
- List of shopping malls in Slovakia
