= List of shopping malls in Qatar =

Modern shopping malls in Qatar trace their roots to the opening of The Centre in 1978 and expanded rapidly from the late 1990s and 2000s into the large, multi-function complexes seen today.

Mall	Location	Gross leasable area (m^{2})	Opened
Al Hazm Mall	Doha	36,000	2017
City Center Doha Mall	Doha	120,000 or 140,000	2001
Doha Festival City	Umm Salal	250,000	2017
Landmark Mall Doha	Al Gharrafa, Al Rayyan	58,000	2000
Mall of Qatar	Rawdat Al Jahhaniya, Al Rayyan	256,000	2015
Mirqab Mall	Doha	40,000	2016
Place Vendôme Mall	Lusail	230,000	2022
Villaggio Mall	Doha	90,000 or 125,000	2009
