= COOP Jednota =

Retail chain based in Slovakia

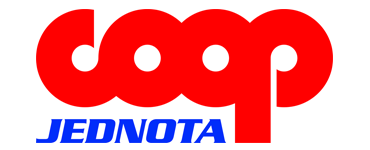
- Type: Private
- Industry: Retail
- Founded: 1845
- Founder: Samuel Jurkovič
- Headquarters: Slovakia
- Website: www.coop.sk

COOP Jednota Slovensko is a consumer cooperative whose members are 30 regional consumer cooperatives (these have the words COOP Jednota in their names), which operate a network of stores. Founded in 1845, COOP Jednota is one of the oldest retail stores in Slovakia. As of December 2025, COOP Jednota operated 1,937 supermarkets and grocery stores in Slovakia.

== History ==
In 1845, Samuel Jurkovič founded the first cooperative in the territory of present-day Slovakia, at that time the Agricultural Association. Later, in 1869, Samuel Ormis founded the predecessor of cooperative retail, the Food Association in the town of Revúca. After 1950, Jednota consumer cooperatives were established in the countryside. Between 1952–1974, the Slovak Union of Consumer Cooperatives was established as the governing body of the Jednots; this was transformed into the legal form of a cooperative in 1997. Near the end of 2002, the Slovak Union of Consumer Cooperatives merged with the COOP Centrum enterprise (founded in 1999) and was renamed COOP Jednota Slovensko, a consumer cooperative.

In 2010, the cooperative COOP Jednota Bratislava, spotrebné družstvo, was separated from COOP Jednota Slovensko, which entered into a contractual partnership with the company CBA Slovakia, a. s., and since 2011 has changed its business name to TERNO Slovensko, spotrebné družstvo. In 2016, TERNO Slovensko de facto transferred its activities to the company Terno real estate s.r.o., whose owner is the Maltese investment fund SANDBERG INVESTMENT FUND SICAV Plc, and TERNO Slovensko, s. d. itself subsequently ceased to exist.

In its recent years, COOP Jednota has become one of the largest food retailers in Slovakia, with the highest share of income of Slovak products, which reaches up to 70%. More than 1 million customers have a customer card and it employs over 14,000 workers.

== Branches ==
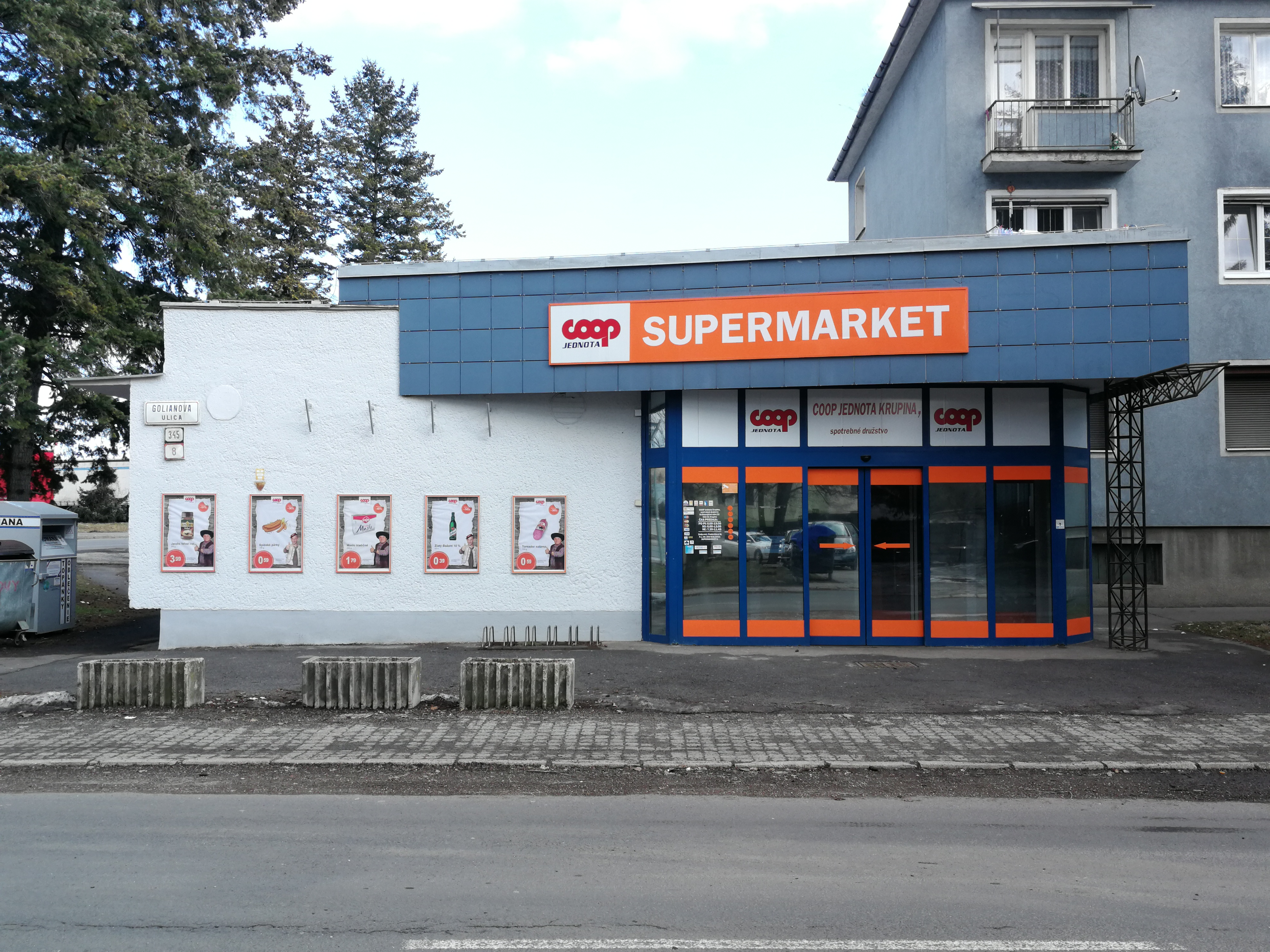
A COOP Supermarket in Banská Bystrica

As of December 31, 2024, the cooperative covered 1,954 stores in Slovakia, most of which are classified into one of three basic formats:

- COOP Supermarket – stores with an area of 200 to 1,000 m², operated in cities and larger villages. This is the fastest growing format, containing approximately 605 stores and accounts for 47.6% of total turnover.
- COOP Potraviny – stores with an area of up to 200 m² with the aim of being as close to the customer as possible, mainly in rural areas, small towns and housing estates. It contains 1248 stores and accounts for approximately 30.6% of total turnover.
- Tempo Supermarket – stores with an area of over 1,000 m², with a wide range of food and non-food products. It contains 101 stores and accounts for 21.8% of total turnover.
- COOP Restaurant - COOP Jednota operates one restaurant in Senica, which offers a daily menu, meals and drinks. It focuses mainly on traditional Slovak cuisine and provides catering services to the public.

== See also ==
- List of supermarket chains in Slovakia
