= Palms Shopping Mall =

The Palms Mall
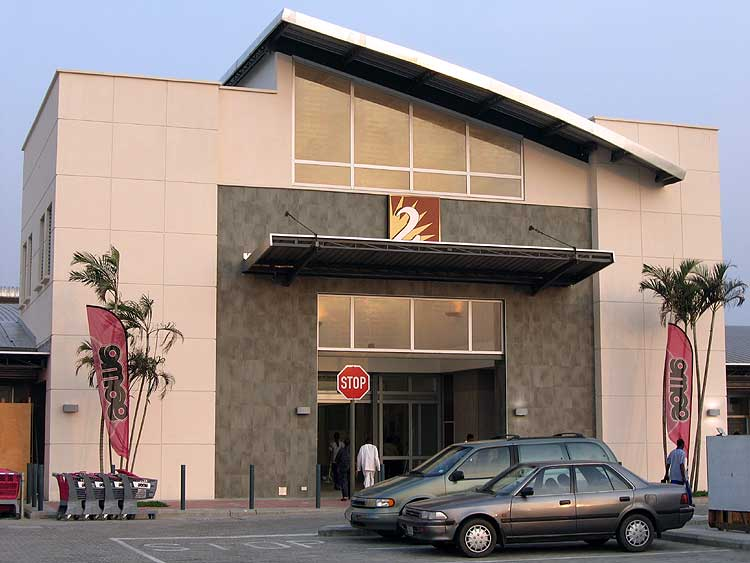
- Location: Lekki, Lagos State, Nigeria
- Coordinates: 6°26′9″N 3°27′4″E
- Opened: 16 December 2005; 20 years ago
- Developer: Persianas Group
- Owner: Persians Property Limited
- Num. of stores: 69 shops
- Num. of anchor tenants: 3
- Floor area: 21,000 m^{2} (230,000 sq ft)
- Floors: 1 floor for shopping and an upper floor for a cinema, Hub Media Store and a coffee shop.
- Parking: 1,000 cars
- Website: thepalmsmall.com

The Palms Shopping Mall is located on a 45,000-square-metre (11-acre) plot of land in Lekki, Lagos State. It has 21,000 square metres (5 acres) of lettable retail space. The mall was built on swampland that was reclaimed recently by the government. After its construction, the mall was commissioned by the Oba of Lagos and President Obasanjo. The mall, which opened in late 2005, has 69 stores and a modern six screen cinema. It also has parking space for about 1000 cars.

The Palms Shopping Mall (up until Polo park opens in Enugu) is the second largest shopping mall by gross leasable area after Ado Bayero Mall located in Kano and first of its kind in Nigeria. The mall is owned by Persianas Properties Limited (Part of the Persianas Group), promoted by a Nigerian Businessman Tayo Amusan, a Nigerian property developer.

The Persianas Group is also developing similar shopping malls in Enugu (Polo Park Mall) and in Kwara (Kwara Mall) - expected to commence trading in the 3rd quarter of 2011. Several other projects are also underway in other parts of Nigeria.

== Tenants ==
The Anchor Tenants at the mall are South African Giants: Game and ShopRite and Genesis Deluxe Cinemas. The line shops, which range in size between 28 and 590 square metres (300-6,400 square feet) come in different widespread categories of diverse merchandise and services.

Game (part of the Massmart Group - recently taken over by Walmart) a discount retail chain occupies the largest space at about 5495 square metres. ShopRite, which labels itself as African's largest grocery store opened their first store in Nigeria at The Palms and The Hub Media Store - Nigeria's largest media store operates on the upper floor.

Genesis Deluxe Cinemas operates a 6 screen cinema on the upper floor showing both international and Nigerian movies.

=== Gallery ===
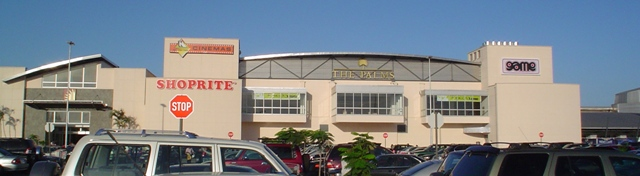

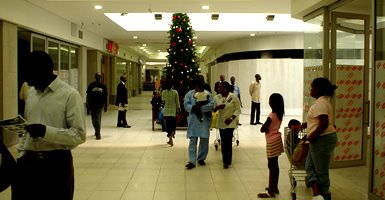

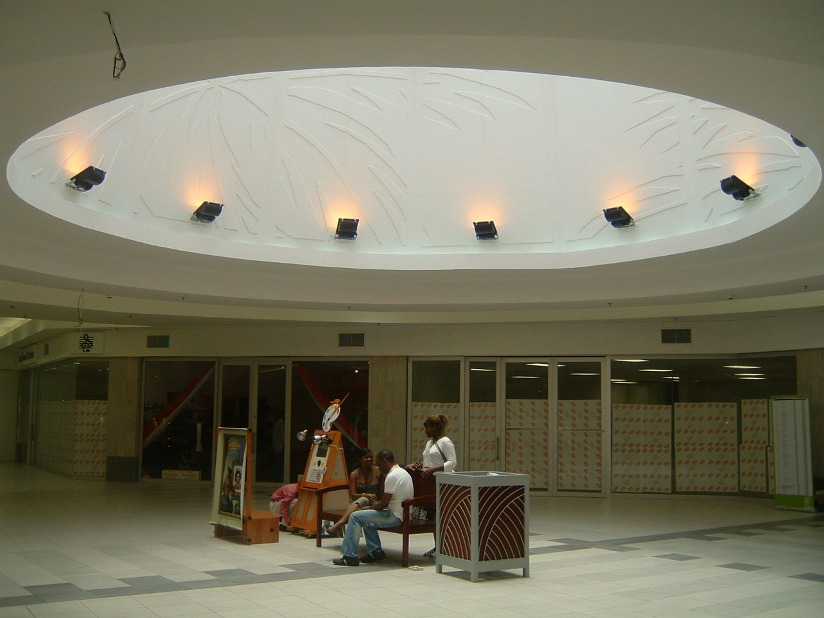

== See also ==
List of largest shopping malls in Nigeria
