= List of shopping malls in Algeria =

Shopping malls in Algeria include:

- Al Qods Shopping Mall, Algiers
- Bab Ezzouar Shopping Mall, Algiers
