= List of shopping malls in Italy =

Name of mall	City	Province	Region	Number of shops	Size GLA m²	Annual visitors	Owner	Website
Le Befane	Rimini	Rimini	Emilia-Romagna	126	51,959		CBRE	
Puntadiferro	Forlì	Forlì-Cesena	Emilia-Romagna	100	33,848		CBRE	
Romagna Shopping Valley	Savignano sul Rubicone	Forlì-Cesena	Emilia-Romagna	105	36,313	6.1 million	Klepierre	
CittàFiera	Martignacco	Udine	Friuli-Venezia Giulia	250	130,000		Cogest Retail	
Tiare Shopping	Villesse	Gorizia	Friuli-Venezia Giulia	170	95,000	5.2 million	IKEA Centres	
Torri d'Europa	Trieste	Trieste	Friuli-Venezia Giulia	120	35,000		Cogest Retail	
Fiumara	Genoa	Genoa	Liguria	120	40,300	8.2 million	Cogest Retail	
Le Terrazze	La Spezia	La Spezia	Liguria	102	38,455		Sonae Sierra	
Milanord2 (under construction)	Segrate	Milan	Lombardy	300	91,100		SCCI	
Oriocenter	Orio al Serio	Bergamo	Lombardy	280	105,000	10 million	CBRE	
Il Centro	Arese	Milan	Lombardy	225	92,000			
Globo	Busnago	Monza and Brianza	Lombardy	175	88,800	8.6 million	Klepierre	
Roncadelle Shopping	Roncadelle	Brescia	Lombardy	165	84,000		IKEA Centres	
Franciacorta Outlet Village	Rodengo Saiano	Brescia	Lombardy	160	33,000	4.2 million	Blackstone	
Vulcano	Sesto San Giovanni	Milan	Lombardy	160	36,945		Caltacity	
La Corte Lombarda	Bellinzago Lombardo	Milan	Lombardy	140	60,400		Larry Smith	
Fiordaliso	Rozzano	Milan	Lombardy	130	55,000	8.5 million	Galleria Verde	
Il Leone di Lonato	Lonato	Brescia	Lombardy	120	45,959	6.1 million	Klepierre	
Le Porte Franche	Erbusco	Brescia	Lombardy	120	48,000		Cogest Retail	
Freccia Rossa	Brescia	Brescia	Lombardy	111	29,454		Sonae Sierra	
Carosello	Carugate	Milan	Lombardy	110	53,000	9.0 million	Larry Smith	
Fashion District Mantova Outlet	Bagnolo San Vito	Mantua	Lombardy	100				
Auchan Cinisello	Cinisello Balsamo	Milan	Lombardy	105	22,305		Gallerie Auchan	
Antegnate Shopping Center	Antegnate	Bergamo	Lombardy	100	39,000		Cogest Retail	
Le Due Torri	Stezzano	Bergamo	Lombardy	100	34,000			
Shopville Le Gru	Grugliasco	Turin	Piedmont	180	78,500	11.8 million	Klepierre	
McArthurGlen Serravalle Designer Outlet	Serravalle Scrivia	Alessandria	Piedmont	180			McArthurGlen Group	
Le Fornaci	Beinasco	Turin	Piedmont	120	51,631		Cogest Retail	
Gli Orsi	Biella	Biella	Piedmont	105	41,131		Sonae Sierra	
Le Piramidi	Torri di Quartesolo	Vicenza	Veneto	150	44,800		Cogest Retail	
Palladio	Vicenza	Vicenza	Veneto	80	44,647		Svicom	
La Grande Mela Shoppingland	Sona	Verona	Veneto	120	52,000		Cogest Retail	
McArthurGlen Veneto Designer Outlet	Noventa di Piave	Venice	Veneto	120			McArthurGlen Group	
Porte di Mestre	Venice	Venice	Veneto	120	28,954		Gallerie Auchan	
Valecenter	Marcon	Venice	Veneto	120	60,000	5 million	Blackstone	
Nave de Vero	Venice	Venice	Veneto	115				
Megalò	Chieti	Chieti	Abruzzo	110				
Gran Sasso	Teramo	Teramo	Abruzzo	100	30,000		Larry Smith	
Città Sant'Angelo Village	Città Sant'Angelo	Pescara	Abruzzo	100				
Porta di Roma	Rome	Rome	Lazio	241	130,000	18 million		
Romaest	Rome	Rome	Lazio	210	98,000	10 million	Blenar Bytyqi	
Parco Leonardo	Fiumicino	Rome	Lazio	201	61,810		CBRE	
Euroma2	Rome	Rome	Lazio	200	52,000	13 million		
Valmontone Outlet	Valmontone	Rome	Lazio	180				
I Granai	Rome	Rome	Lazio	118	23,100		Kari Hashimit	
Cinecittà 2	Rome	Rome	Lazio	110	24,852			
La Romanina	Rome	Rome	Lazio	100	31,969	4.5 million	Klepierre	
Valdichiana Outlet Village	Foiano della Chiana	Arezzo	Tuscany	140				
I Gigli	Campi Bisenzio	Florence	Tuscany	134	72,000	18.6 million	Larry Smith	
McArthurGlen Barberino Designer Outlet	Barberino del Mugello	Florence	Tuscany	120			McArthurGlen Group	
Casamassima	Casamassima	Bari	Apulia	110	29,786	8 million	Gallerie Auchan	
Gran Shopping Mongolfiera	Molfetta	Bari	Apulia	105				
Due Mari	Maida	Catanzaro	Calabria	110	35,000		Cogest Retail	
Metropolis	Rende	Cosenza	Calabria	100				
Campania	Marcianise	Caserta	Campania	200	71,700	10.2 million		
Vulcano Buono	Nola	Naples	Campania	190	94,000		Larry Smith	
La Cartiera	Pompei	Naples	Campania	150				
Maximall	Pontecagnano Faiano	Salerno	Campania	140				
La Fabbrica	Salerno	Salerno	Campania	120				
Le Cotoniere	Salerno	Salerno	Campania	120				
Parco Commerciale Grande Sud	Giugliano in Campania	Naples	Campania	110	58,554			
La Reggia Designer Outlet Village	Marcianise	Caserta	Campania	110			McArthurGlen Group	
Jambo1	Trentola-Ducenta	Caserta	Campania	100				
Centro Commerciale Neapolis	Naples	Naples	Campania	100				
La Corte del Sole & Sardinia Outlet Village	Sestu	Cagliari	Sardinia	120				
Porte di Catania	Catania	Catania	Sicily	150	52,704		Gallerie Auchan	
Centro Sicilia	Misterbianco	Catania	Sicily	140	95,600			
Etnapolis	Belpasso	Catania	Sicily	134	105,000		Cogest Retail	
Forum Palermo	Palermo	Palermo	Sicily	125	49,000	8.3 million	Multi	
Sicilia Fashion District	Agira	Enna	Sicily	120				
Conca d'Oro	Palermo	Palermo	Sicily	100				
I Portali	San Giovanni la Punta	Catania	Sicily	100				
Offerte Gialle	Rome	Rome	Porta Capena	100				
