= List of shopping malls in Nepal =

This is a list of shopping malls in Nepal. This list contains some of the most notable shopping malls in the country, each with its own unique offerings and qualities

| Name | Province | Location | Established | Floor area (sq. ft) |
|---|---|---|---|---|
| Bhat-Bhateni Super Market | Koshi | Biratnagar; Damak; Dharan; Itahari; Birtamod | 1984 | 10,000,000+ (combined) |
| Bhat-Bhateni Super Market | Madhesh | Janakpur; Birgunj | 1984 | 10,000,000+ (combined) |
| Bhat-Bhateni Super Market | Bagmati | Kathmandu (9); Lalitpur (3); Bhaktapur; Hetauda; Bharatpur | 1984 | 10,000,000+ (combined) |
| Bhat-Bhateni Super Market | Gandaki | Pokhara | 1984 | 10,000,000+ (combined) |
| Bhat-Bhateni Super Market | Lumbini | Butwal; Bhairahawa; Nepalgunj | 1984 | 10,000,000+ (combined) |
| Bhat-Bhateni Super Market | Sudurpashchim | Dhangadhi | 1984 | 10,000,000+ (combined) |
| Bishal Bazar | Bagmati | Kathmandu | 1970 | |
| Kathmandu Mall | Bagmati | Kathmandu | | |
| United World Trade Centre | Bagmati | Kathmandu | | |
| Chhaya Center | Bagmati | Kathmandu | 2018 | 860,000 |
| People’s Plaza | Bagmati | Kathmandu | | |
| Sherpa Mall | Bagmati | Kathmandu | | |
| Bluebird Mall | Bagmati | Kathmandu | | |
| City Center | Bagmati | Kathmandu | | |
| KL Tower and Multicomplex | Bagmati | Kathmandu | | |
| CTC Mall | Bagmati | Kathmandu | 2013 | 320,000 |
| Civil Mall | Bagmati | Kathmandu | 2010 | |
| Labim Mall | Bagmati | Lalitpur | | |
| Rising Mall | Bagmati | Kathmandu | | |
| Times Square Mall | Bagmati | Kathmandu | | |
| BG Mall | Bagmati | Kathmandu | | |
| National Business Trade Center (NBTC) | Bagmati | Kathmandu | 2014 | 523,767 |
| Star Mall | Bagmati | Kathmandu | | |
| Eyeplex Mall | Bagmati | Kathmandu | | |
| Buddha Mall | Bagmati | Kathmandu | | |
| Lotse Mall | Bagmati | Kathmandu | | |
| One Durbar Mall | Bagmati | Kathmandu | | 35,000 |
| Kantipur Mall | Bagmati | Kathmandu | | |
| North Point Mall | Bagmati | Kathmandu | | |
| Birtamod City Center | Bagmati | Kathmandu | | |
| Times Square Mall | Bagmati | Kathmandu | | |
| Damak Mall | Koshi | Damak | | |
| Central Mall | Koshi | Biratnagar | | |
| Narayani Mall | Bagmati | Hetauda | | |
| Pokhara Trade Mall | Gandaki | Pokhara | 2014 | 32,856 |
| Lakeside Center | Gandaki | Pokhara | | |
| Gorkha Departmental Store | Koshi | Damak; Itahari; Dharan | | |
| Kantipur Mall | Bagmati | Kathmandu | | |
| Kalimati Trade Center | Bagmati | Kathmandu | | |
| NB Center | Bagmati | Kathmandu | | |
| Basundhara Shopping Center | Bagmati | Kathmandu | | |
| City Square Mall | Bagmati | Kathmandu | | |
| Western Mall | Lumbini | Nepalgunj | | |
