= List of shopping malls in Angola =

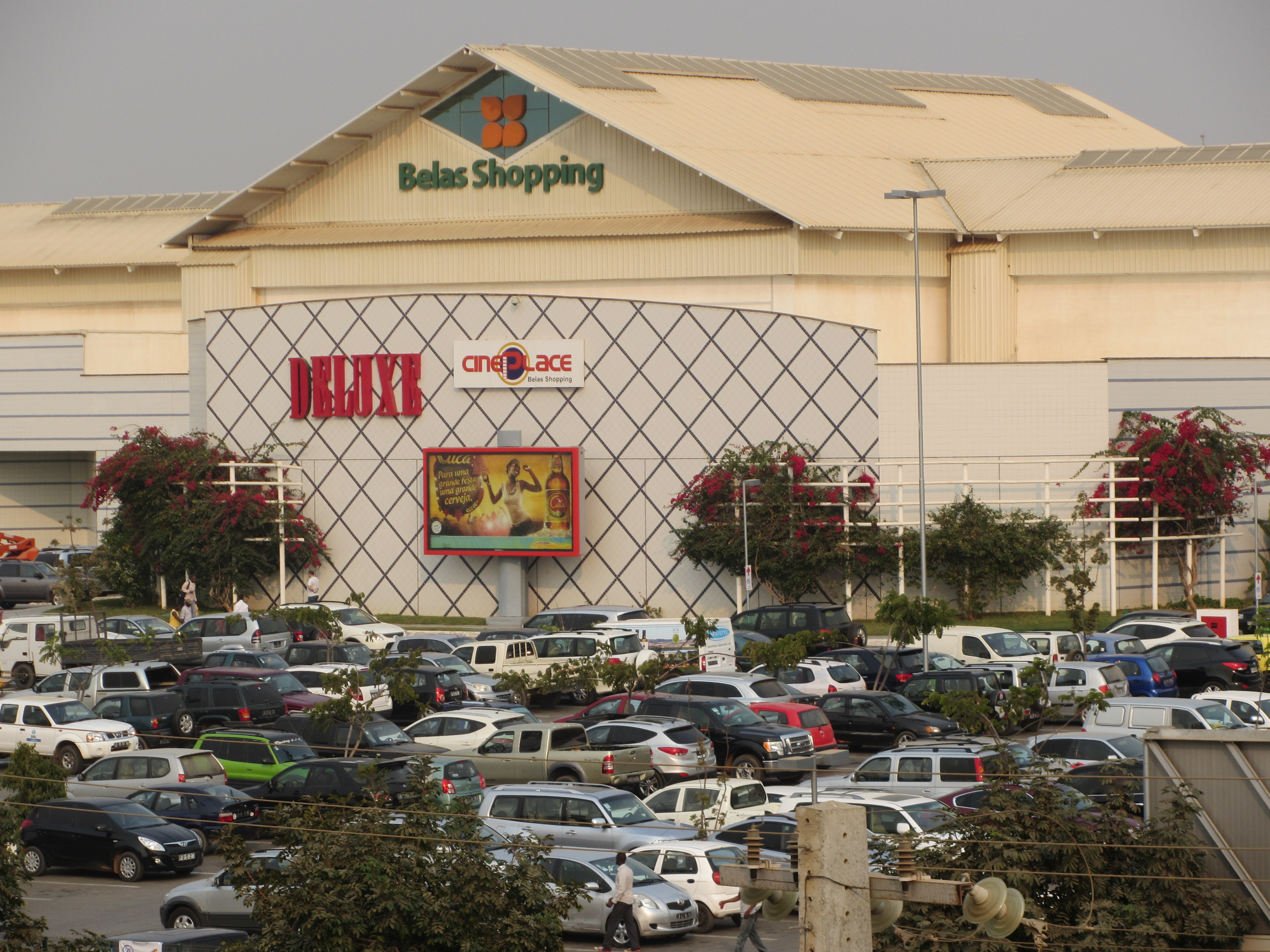

This is a list of shopping malls in Angola.

- Africa mall
- Belas Shopping – Angola's first mall which opened in 2007
- Complexo Multifuncional
- Fortaleza Shopping Centre
- Xyami – a chain which started constructing malls in 2015, including one which was Angola's biggest when it opened in Kilamba in 2017
- Atrium Nova Vida in Luanda
- Avennida Shopping Centre in Luanda
