= List of shopping malls in Iran =

This is a list of shopping malls in Iran.

| Mall | City | Year opened | Gross leasable area (GLA) | Total area | Shops | Remarks |
|---|---|---|---|---|---|---|
| Iran Mall | Tehran | 2019 | 1,450,000 m^{2} (15 million sq ft) | 1,950,000 m^{2} (21 million sq ft) | 2500+ | It is the biggest mall in the world |
| Isfahan City Center | Isfahan | 2012 | 465,500 m^{2} (5.1 million sq ft) | 600,000 m^{2} (6.5 million sq ft) | 770+ | This mixed-use shopping mall complex includes a 5-star hotel, cinema, the biggest indoor amusement park in the Middle East with 345,000 square meters, restaurants, international financial exchange center, office tower, exhibition center and hotel apartment. |
| Persian Gulf Complex | Shiraz | 2012 | 450,000 m^{2} (4.8 million sq feet) | 500,000 m^{2} | 2500+ | World's largest by number of stores. As of 2012 the only store opened is Hyperstar. The rest is now vacant. |
| Almas-e-Shargh | Mashhad | 2001 | | | | |
| Kian Center | Mashhad | 2012 | 140,000 m^{2} (1.5 sq ft) | | | |
| Proma Hypermarket | Mashhad | 2012 | 420,000 m^{2} (4.5 million sq feet) | | 430 | |
| Tirajeh I | Tehran | | | | | |
| Tirajeh II | Tehran | | | | | |
| Milad-e Noor Shopping Center | Tehran | | | | | |
| Kourosh Complex | Tehran | | | | | |
| Golestan | Tehran | | | | | |
| Mega Mall | Tehran | | | | | |
| Palladium Shopping Center | Tehran | 2015 | | | | |
| Sana Shopping Center | Tehran | 2017 | | | | |
| Ghoo Middle East Diamond Complex | Salman Shahr | | | | | |
| Oxin City Center | Amol | 2016 | | | | |
| Panorama Shopping Center | Kelarabad | 2018 | | | | |
| Sarina Shopping Mall | Kish | 2016 | | | | |

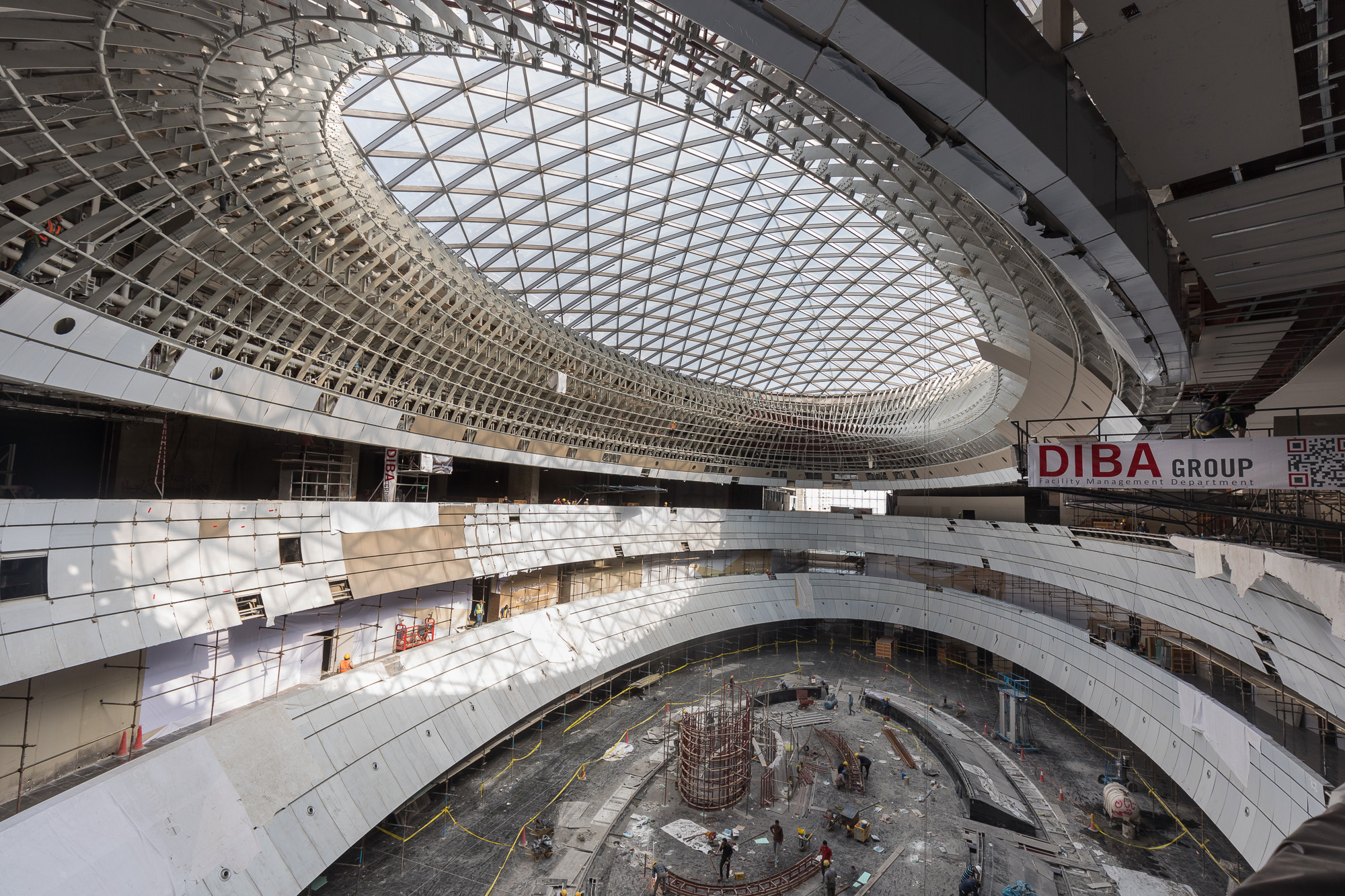
Iran Mall in Tehran is one of the biggest shopping malls in the world.
