= Eurodom Osijek =

Eurodom
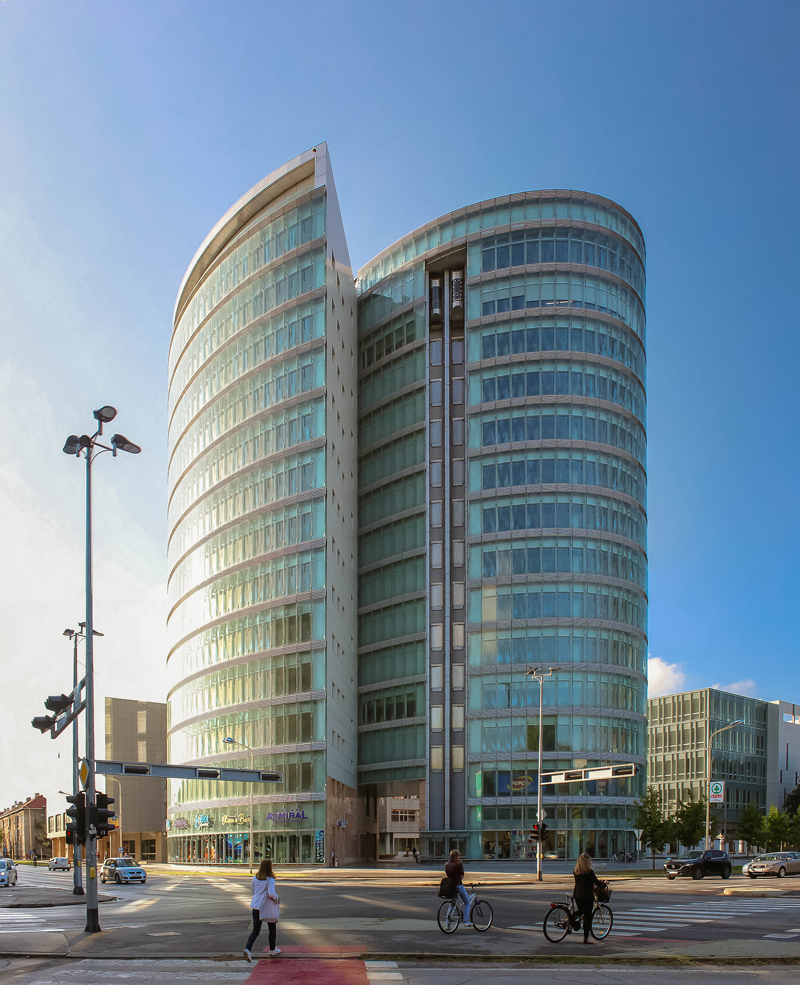
- Interactive map of the Eurodom area

General information
- Status: Completed
- Type: Business and cultural center
- Architectural style: Modern
- Location: Osijek, Croatia
- Coordinates: 45°33′19″N 18°41′41″E
- Completed: 2015
- Cost: 650 million HRK
- Owner: Eurodom d.d.

Height
- Height: 65 m (213 ft)

Technical details
- Floor count: 12 (towers)

Eurodom is a business, shopping and cultural center in Osijek, Croatia.

It is named after Eurodom company, which was established in 2002.

The whole complex is 85,000 m^{2} (910,000 sq ft) and it consists of three buildings, two are business towers and the third is a shopping mall and cultural center.

== Business tower ==
Business tower consists of two towers, which are popularly called Osijek Twins (Croatian: Osječki blizanci). It has twelve floors and the height is 61 m (200 ft).
