= King Cross Leopolis =

- Location: Lviv, Ukraine
- Coordinates: 49°46′23″N 24°0′38″E
- Opened: March 26, 2010
- Owner: King Cross Group S.r.l.
- Num. of stores: 110
- Floor area: 116,000 m^{2} (1,250,000 sq ft)
- Floors: 2 Levels
- Parking: 1800 cars
- Website: kingcross.com.ua/en

King Cross Leopolis is a shopping mall located in Lviv, Ukraine that opened on 26 March 2010. It has a total area of 116,546 m^{2} (1,254,490 sq ft) and is the largest mall in western Ukraine.

The centre features about 110 shops, with a sizeable shopping gallery over 52,700 m² of leasable space, and includes venues like a hypermarket, fashion outlets (e.g. Inditex brands), restaurants, and entertainment zones like a multiplex cinema, ice rink, and bowling alley. Parking capacity is around 1,800 cars.

King Cross Leopolis is often described as the largest shopping center in Western Ukraine, particularly in terms of its total area and regional draw. It comprises two levels of retail and entertainment space, and it has gained prominence as a landmark destination for both shopping and leisure in Lviv.

== Description ==
The first phase of the mall opened in 2008. It consisted solely of the Praktiker store, which occupied 8,174 m^{2} (87,980 sq ft). In 2016, the store closed and in 2016 an EpiCentre K store opened in its place.

The second phase, opened in 2010, consists of the shopping mall itself. It consists 50,000 m^{2} (540,000 sq ft) of total area on two levels; including an Auchan hypermarket with an area of 13,000 m^{2} (140,000 sq ft), and over 100 commercial stores: boutiques, household stores, cafes, restaurants, a large Planeta Kino multiplex, bowling alley, ice rink, recreation complex, overground and underground parking lot are also included in the mall.

A third phase of the mall is planned to be constructed in the future. It will include an additional 20,000 m^{2} (220,000 sq ft) of lease area; this will include 130 commercial stores. Additionally, the parking area will be increased by 600 parking spaces.

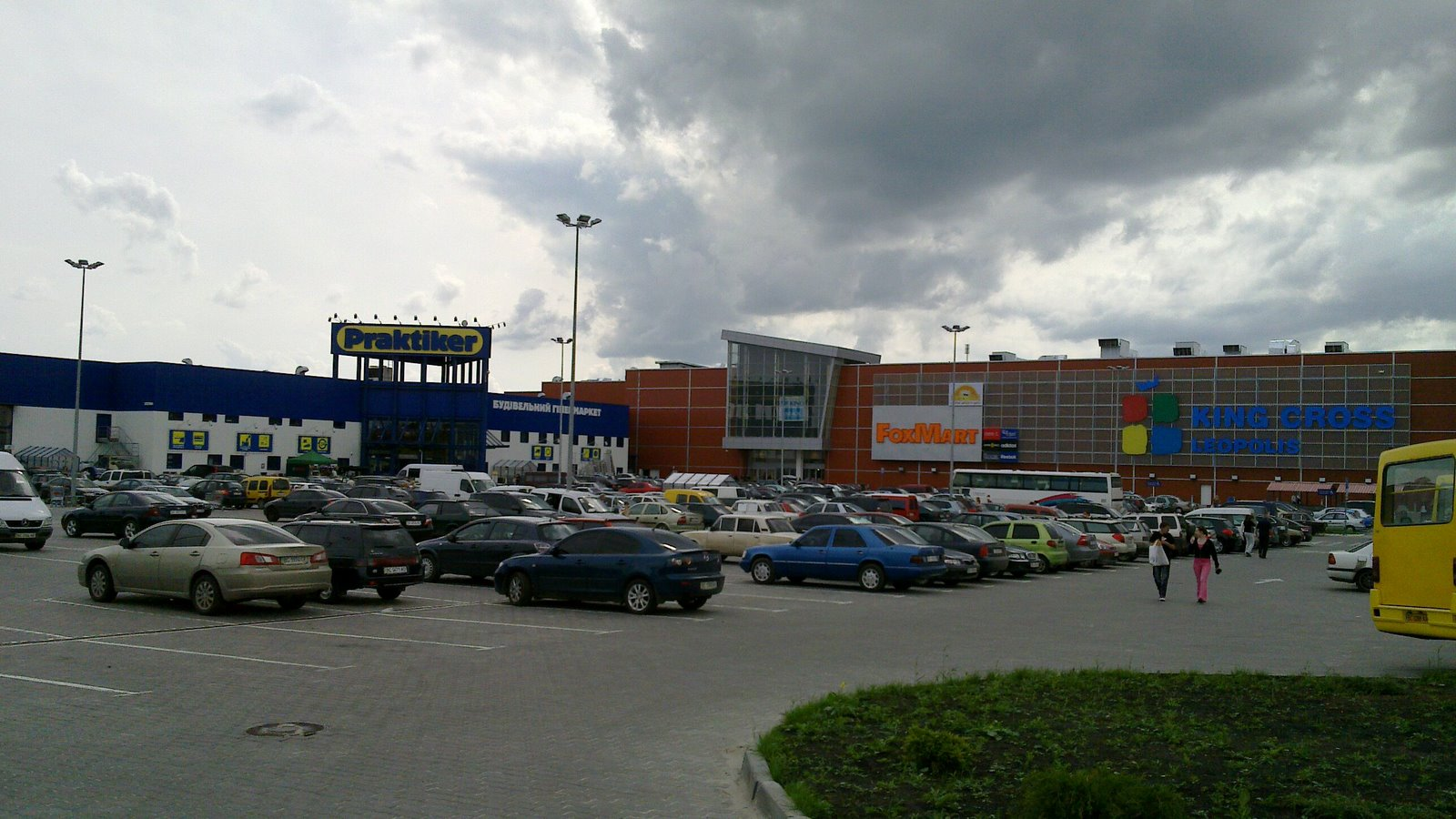
King Cross Leopolis (2010)

== See also ==
- Forum Lviv — another shopping mall in Lviv.
