= Rīga Plaza =

Rīga Plaza is a shopping centre located in Rīga, Latvia, on the left bank of the Daugava. With a total size of 90,000 m^{2}, it is the fourth largest shopping centre in Latvia.

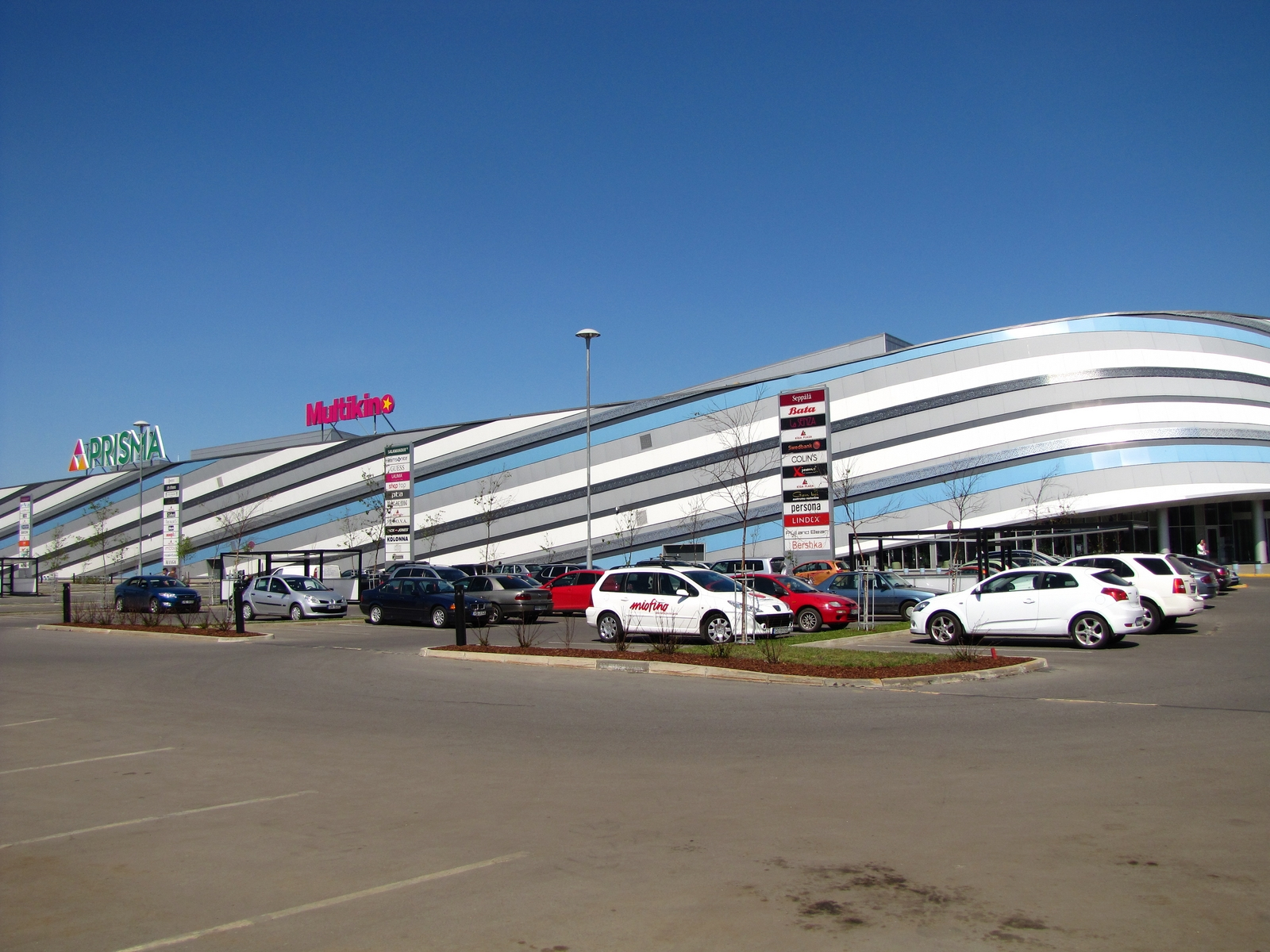
Riga Plaza, opened in 2009.

== History ==
Construction began in 2007 and the shopping center was opened in 2009. The development of the project was headed by a joint venture of the two companies "New Century Holdings" and "Plaza Centers NV", with the management of the opened centre being assigned to "Euro Mall Centre Management".

In February 2010 a cinema with 8 auditoriums and a total seating capacity of 1524 was opened in the centre by the company "New Europe Cinema".

In 2011, a new bowling alley was created in Riga Plaza with the name FantasyPark. The bowling alley to this day is located in the same area as the cinema.

In 2016, the centre was sold for €93.4m to an unnamed global investment fund.

Shortly before Christmas 2016, the centre was briefly closed and evacuated by the municipal police for technical reasons. Other locations of the supermarket chain "Prisma" were closed during the same period.

In 2017, the aforementioned chain "Prisma" ceased its operations in Latvia and subsequently closed the store at the Riga Plaza. Shortly after, the shopping centre announced an agreement with the Lithuanian company "Maxima", which is expected to open a new store at the centre in Spring 2018.

== Shops ==
The Riga Plaza centre has capacity for over 140 shops, one supermarket, one cinema and an entertainment area with bowling alleys. Furthermore, it offers parking spaces for up to 1471 vehicles.

Stores present at the centre include the German "Peek & Cloppenburg", "s.Oliver", also the Spanish brands "Zara", "Stradivarius" , "Mango" and the Swedish "H&M". On the second floor, a restaurant area is installed, as well as the cinema and entertainment area.

On December 2, 2020, it was announced that "Rīga Plaza" has been sold to the Estonian investment company Summus Capital and Ivar Vendelin. In April 2021, real estate services company Colliers took over management of the center.

== Access ==
Located on Mukusalas iela 71, the centre can be accessed by car via the A8 motorway.

By public transport, the Rigas Satiksme bus lines no. 23 and 26 as well as the trolleybus lines no. 19, 24 and 27 stop in the vicinity of the centre.
