= List of shopping malls in North Macedonia =

This is a list of shopping malls in North Macedonia.

City	Name of Shopping Mall
Skopje	Skopje City Mall
Skopje	Ramstore Mall
Skopje	Capitol Mall
Skopje	Diamond Mall
Skopje	Vero Centar
Skopje	City Gallery Mall
Skopje	SP Planet
Skopje	Skopje East Gate
Kumanovo	Shopping Center SUMA
Kumanovo	Shopping Center Serava
Kumanovo	Shopping Center Garnizon
Tetovo	Palma Mall
Bitola	Bliss Mall & Retail Park
Stip	Stip City Mall
Struga	Dua Mall
