= List of shopping malls in Slovakia =

This list of shopping malls in Slovakia is a list of shopping malls in Slovakia, sorted by city.

City	Shopping malls
Banská Bystrica	Europa Shopping Center; Radvaň Park; Terminal Vlak Bus Shopping; Point; Astra
Bratislava	Central (since 10/2012); Aupark Shopping Center (since 2001); Polus City Center (since 2000); Avion Shopping Park (since 2002); Shopping Palace Zlaté Piesky (since 2004); Danubia Centrum (since 2000); Galéria Lamač (since 2008); Cubicon; Eurovea Galleria (since 03/2010); OC Rača; Korzo shopping park (since 01/2012); Bory Mall (since 11/2014); Podunajská brána (since 2026); Nivy Centrum (since 2021)
Dunajská Streda	Family Center; OC Galéria; ZOC Max
Hlohovec	OC Váh
Košice	Atrium Optima; Cassovia Shopping centre; Galéria Košice; Aupark; Department store Dargov; Shopping Gallery Naša; OD Urban; ShopBox
Levice	City Park; Europa Shopping Center (under construction)
Liptovský Mikuláš	Jasná Shopping City; NC Liptov; Stop Shop
Malacky	Malavia
Martin	Tulip; Campo di Martin
Michalovce	OC Zemplín
Nitra	OC Galéria; Centro; Mlyny; Family Center; ZOC Max
Nové Zámky	Stop Shop; Aquario; OC Piritov
Piešťany	Aupark; Family center
Poprad	Stop Shop; ZOC Max; Horse (under construction)
Prešov	ZOC Max; Eperia
Prievidza	Korzo Shopping Park
Skalica	ZOC Max
Spišská Nová Ves	Madaras; Neo Zona
Štúrovo	Aquario
Trenčín	Stop Shop; Laugaricio; ZOC Max
Trnava	ONE Fashion Outlet; Arkadia; OC Galéria; ZOC Max; City Arena
Zvolen	Stop Shop; Europa Shopping Center
Žilina	Atrium Dubeň; ZOC Max; Aupark; Mirage; Europalace

== See also ==
- List of supermarket chains in Slovakia
