= List of shopping malls in Greece =

Metro Mall in Athens, Greece.

Mediterranean Cosmos in Thessaloniki, Greece.

This is a list of shopping malls in Greece, listed in alphabetical order, by region.

Region/City	Mall	Size (TBA)
Athens	Athenian Capitol	
Athens	Athens Heart	
Athens	Athens Metro Mall	
Athens	Attica Department Store	
Athens	AVENUE Mall	
Athens	The Golden Hall Mall	
Athens	The Mall Athens	
Athens	McArthurGlen Designer Outlet Athens	
Athens	River West Mall	
Athens	SmartPark	
Athens	West Plaza Shopping Centre	
Heraklion	Talos Plaza	
Corinth	Mare West	
Thessaloniki	Makedonia Mall	
Thessaloniki	Mediterranean Cosmos	
Thessaloniki	One Salonica	
Thessaloniki	Shopping Center Limani Thessaloniki	
Thessaloniki	Florida Shopping Center	
Larissa	Pantheon Plaza	
Patra	Patra Mall	
