= Forum Lviv =

- Location: Lviv, Ukraine
- Coordinates: 49°50′58.9″N 24°01′24.6″E
- Opened: September 25, 2015
- Owner: Multi Corporation
- Num. of stores: 120
- Floor area: sqm
- Floors: 3 levels
- Parking: 600 cars
- Website: lviv.multi.eu

Forum Lviv is a shopping centre in Lviv, Ukraine, opened on September 25, 2015.

== Description ==
Located in the central part of the city of Lviv on Pid Dubom Street, it has three floors with a total retail area 35,000 m² and an underground carpark for 600 cars. The shopping mall contains a cinema, leisure facilities and restaurants while overlooking the city.

In the mall, many Ukrainian and international brands are represented including; a Silpo supermarket and a Comfy electronics supermarket as anchor tenants, Others include; Samsung, Planeta Kino cinema, Zara, Bershka, Pull & Bear, Stradivarius, Massimo Dutti, Pierre Cardin, Oysho, Mango, LC Waikiki, Reserved, Cropp, House, Sinsay, CCC, Intertop, Colin's, Timberland, Lacoste, Pandora, Brocard, Wójcik, Intimissimi, Women'secret, Budynok Igrashok, Igroland children entertainment, Sushiya, McDonald's and others.

The mall is owned by Dutch company Multi Corporation.

== See also ==
- King Cross Leopolis — another shopping mall in Lviv.
