= List of shopping malls in Azerbaijan =

This is an incomplete list of shopping malls in Azerbaijan.

== Baku ==
- AF Mall
- AMAY Trade Center
- Amburan Mall
- Aygun City
- Bina Trade Center
- Caspian Shopping Center
- Central Shopping Mall
- City Mall
- Crescent Mall
- Deniz Mall
- Diglas Trade Center
- Elite Trade and Entertainment Center
- Ganjlik Mall
- Khagani Trade Center
- Mall 28
- Metropark
- Moscow Shopping Mall
- Nargiz Shopping Center
- Nasimi Bazaar
- Oriental Bazaar
- Park Bulvar
- Port Baku Mall
- Riyad Trade Center
- Sadarak Trade Center
- Sahil Trade Center
- Shuvalan Park
- Nizami Mall

== Ganja ==
- Ganja Mall
- Aura Park
- Abad Trade Center
- Ganja Central Shopping Center
- Golden Palace Shopping Center

== Sumgait ==
- Karvan shopping mall
