= Ocean Plaza =

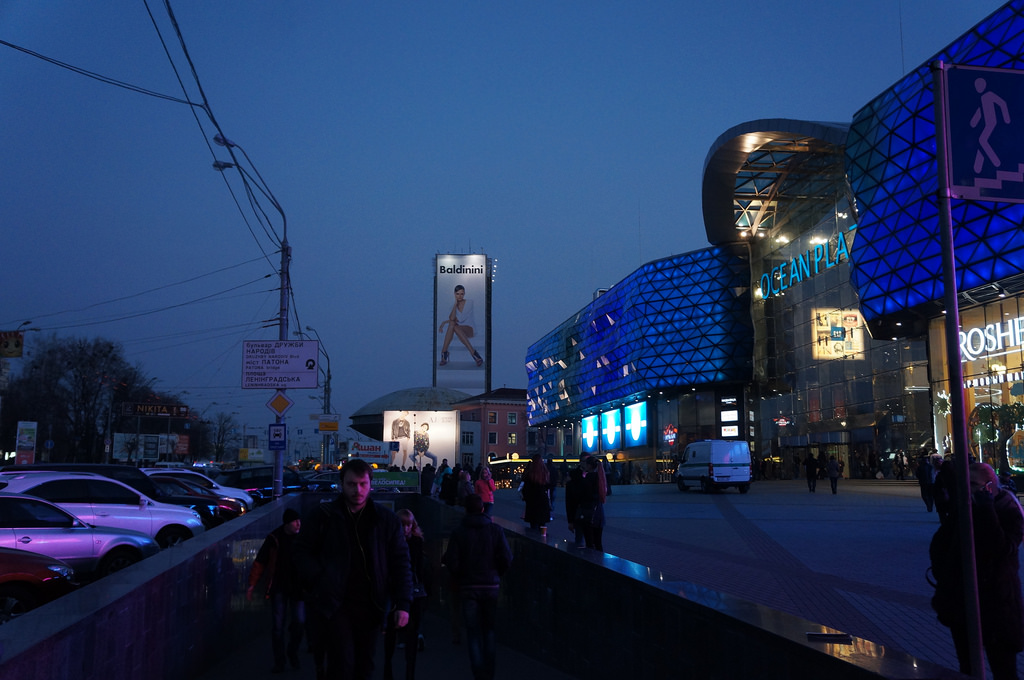
- Location: Kyiv
- Coordinates: 50.412139°N 30.5225°E
- Address: 176 Antonovycha Street
- Opened: 19 November 2012
- Previous names: Lybid Plaza
- Developer: KAN Development; UDP
- Owner: TPS Nedvizhimost
- Architect: Andriy Pashenko
- Floor area: 1,200 square kilometres (1.3×10^{10} sq ft)
- Floors: 4
- Parking: 4 levels
- Website: oceanplaza.com.ua

Ocean Plaza is one of the largest shopping and entertainment complexes of Kyiv, Ukraine. It was inaugurated in 2012 and currently houses more than 470 stores and 40 restaurants and cafes. The second queue of the mall is called Ocean Mall, it's located next to original mall and is currently under construction.

== Architecture ==
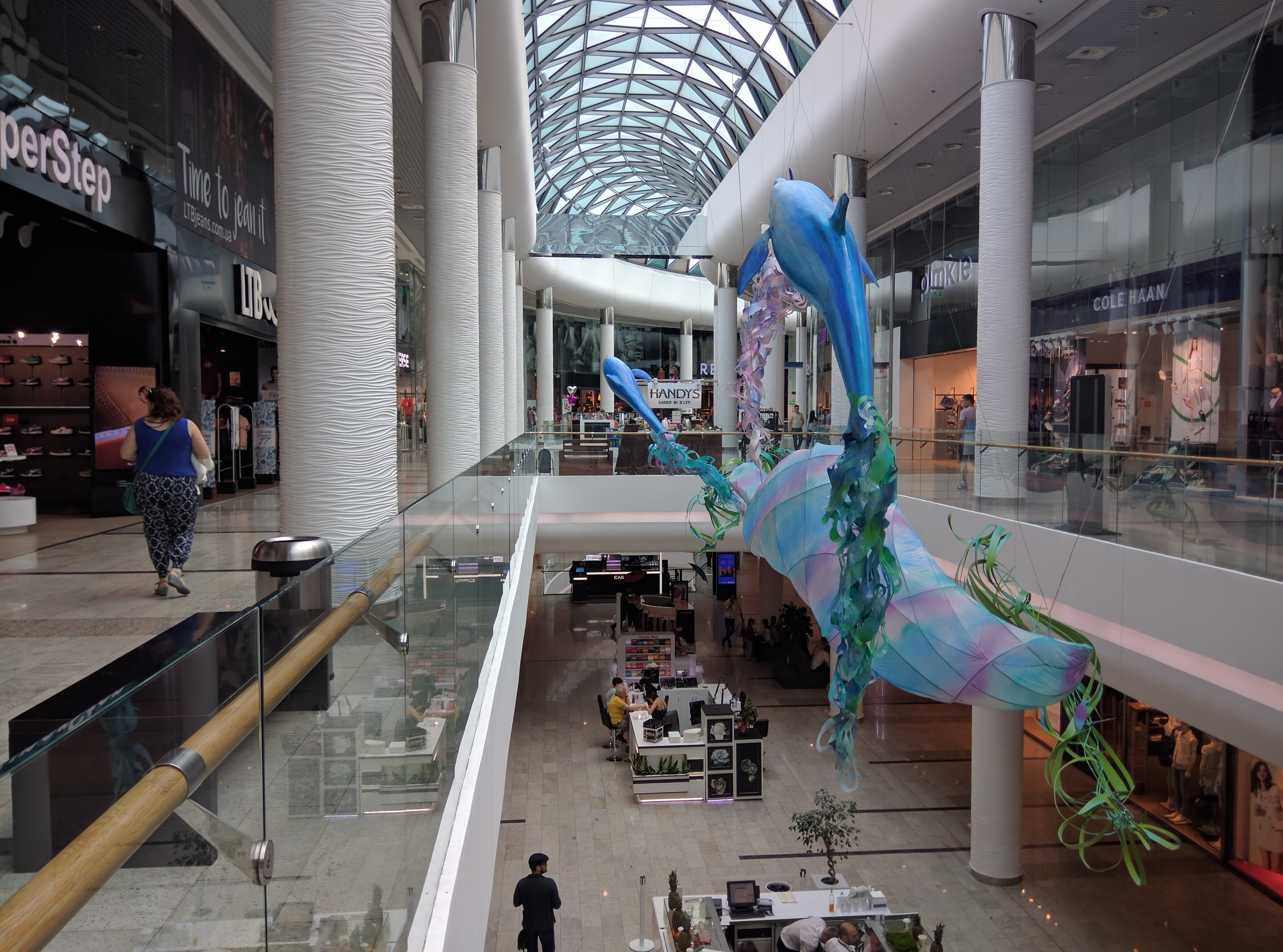
Interior of the Ocean Plaza

The plaza contains space for more than 400 stores and 30 restaurants and cafes in approximately 165,000 square metres (1,780,000 sq ft). The plaza has 7 floors and a parking area of 1600 parking lots. At the time of its completion, Ocean Plaza had been the largest mall in Ukraine, and it kept this status until Lavina Mall's opening in 2016. The plaza has a 350,000-liter giant aquarium with more than 1,000 sea creatures and offers a 16-meter-long panoramic view. There are several multiplexes and movie theatres. Ukraine's first 7D cinema was housed in this plaza. In 2013, Forpoint opened Ukraine's first Cinnabon cafe at this plaza.

== History ==
In 2000s, a market near the Kyiv Refrigeration Plant was demolished to build a large mall called Lybid Plaza. It was named after the Lybid River at the bank of which the construction site was located. The original project was bigger, the building's area was one million m². Lybid Plaza was presented at MAPIC retail forum in Cannes in 2007 and 2008, and various developers were interested in buying a 50% share of the it, but the 2008 financial crisis interrupted these plans.

After the crisis, the project was renamed Ocean Plaza, and its space was cut to 150 000 m^{2}. Also, it was planned to build an office tower and an apartment tower as the mall's second queue; however, they were cancelled later on.

The construction of the mall began in 2010 with a plan of finishing it in March 2012, prior to UEFA Football Championship. In November, KAN Development presented the updated project at MAPIC-2010. In December, Ocean Mall project was also presented at Mall Expo 2010 summit in Kyiv where it had won the Mall Awards 2010 in the category Best Project in the Capital. In November 2011, UTG presented the project at MAPIC-2011.

In December 2011, the statue made by Frank Meisler was transported from Israel to Ukraine in order to be placed inside Ocean Plaza and to become a symbol of the mall.

In July 2012, Vasyl Khmelnytsky, Andriy Ivanov and Vagif Aliev sold Ocean Plaza to Russian TPS Nedvizhimost for US$280−350 million.

Ocean Plaza was opened on 19 November 2012. Initially, US$200 million was invested for the project. Before the inauguration of the plaza, Kyiv Post reported in their newspaper that the event was the "most anticipated events for Kyiv's retail world." Right after the official inauguration, an opening celebration took place on 7 December.

The City Beach Club opened 20 August 2013 on the rooftop of Ocean Plaza's multilevel parking.

In December 2013, the mall won at CP Awards 2013 in Kyiv in the category Large Shopping Mall.

== Ownership controversies ==
Ocean Plaza is controlled by Lybid investment union which was co-founded 16 October 2006 by Ukrainian investment and development companies UDP and KAN Development, the latter would also be conducting the construction through its subsidiary. In 2009 a $150 million credit was taken from Cypriot company Ethoder Investments Limited to build the mall, the pledge being future Ocean Plaza itself.

In July 2012, before the opening, the mall was sold to Russian TPS Nedvizhimost, they would also buy Ethoder who gave Lybid the credit. The company was controlled by Arkady Rotenberg, Alexander Ponomarenko and Aleksandr Skorobogatko, oligarchs from the close circle of President of Russia Vladimir Putin.

After the Russo-Ukrainian War began in 2014, Ocean Plaza got affected by Do not buy Russian goods! boycott campaign against Russian business that funded the occupation forces. After that Rotenberg would list his children Igor and Liliya as the mall's owners instad of himself. Using the money received through Ethoder Igor Rotenberg would buy Russian cartridge factories in Tula and Ulyanovsk that would get state contracts to supply Russian Army.

On 26 November 2018, unknown people attacked the mall with smoke grenades, and visitors were evacuated. On 28 November, Sokil nationalist activism organization took Ocean Plaza under their 'peaceful control'. Over 200 nationalists captured the mall with a goal of stopping Russian oligarchy from financing the war. In social media, the organization described their actions as a peaceful protest and stated that they didn't interrupt the work of Ukrainian business. They also told people not to panic and warned them about possible provocations from Rotenberg's allies.

In October 2019, Liliya Rotenberg left the owner role. However, the Cyprus offshore Ocean Plaza Project, which was listed as one of the owners, was owned by Rotenberg family retaining Ocean Plaza's Russian ownership.

In 2020 Ukrainian businessman and the founder of UDP Vasyl Khmelnytsky bought back a 33.35% stake in Ocean Plaza.

In 2022 Ocean Plaza, like many other Ukrainian malls, had been closed due to Russian invasion. However, unlike the others, it hadn't been opened after the liberation of Kyiv Oblast. Court proceedings about money laundering at Ocean Plaza began, the mall was found to evade taxes in 2016–2021. At first Pechersk District Court didn't find any ties to Russian business and cancelled the arrest, which allowed mall to reopen 22 November 2022, but in August 2023, the mall was eventually seized and control was transferred to the Asset Tracing and Management Agency (ARMA).

In September 2023, Deputy Davyd Arakhamia announced the nationalization of Ocean Plaza. Following the announcement Khmelnytskyi had sold his stake to his business partner Andriy Ivanov through his company Lanita Invest. At first the ownership change ran into problems, Ivanov's company prohibited State Property Fund (FDMU) from controlling the mall.

In February 2024 FDMU began forming the auction commission to determine the mall's price, the auction would be held at Prozorro. In April the starting price was announced to be ₴1.65 billion. In June Ministry of Justice used the new asset seizure law to ask the High Anti-Corruption Court to nationalized Lybid's debt to Rotenberg's Ethoder that hadn't been paid since February 2022 and was impeding with the selling procedure. Court has made a decision to write off the dept on 4 September. Following the procedure FDMU asked to seize not only dept but also the property in case the credit wouldn't be paid until 31 December, that process delayed the auction. Due to unclear ownership status and high rental stake businesses began to leave Ocean Plaza.

23 January 2026 Cabinet of Ministers simplified the sanctioned property sale process allowing the sale of credit requirements in the same package and setting up re-auction for a lower price in case of the previous one failing. Ocean Plaza was announced as one of the first objects for sale in March.

== Accidents ==
In December 2012, when the construction work inside the mall was still in progress, a part of the ceiling collapsed between the stores. Details of the accident are unknown.

In the evening of 13 January 2020, due to an accident at the underground pipeline, Ocean Plaza was flooded with boiling water. Asphalt on surrounding streets collapsed and the minibus that was passing the mall almost fell into the hole on the road. The shopping mall's security had to block the elevators because the underground floor was completely filled with water. People from the first floor had to get up to the top floors with escalators or jump into their shopping carts. That day, ten people were hospitalized with light burns.

On 16 January 2022, an unknown person informed the call center of Security Service of Ukraine that Ocean Plaza had been mined. People were evacuated from the mall and the building was examined, but the information turned out to be false and no explosives were found.

8 August 2025, a woman driving Mazda CX-5 mistook a gas pedal for brakes while exiting Ocean Plaza's indoor parking and crashed through the entrance into pedestrian part, colliding with wall inside the mall. Police filed administrative charges against the driver.
