= Mirqab Mall =

Coordinates: 25°16′24.5″N 51°30′5.5″E

Al Mirqab Mall
- المرقاب مول
- Location: Al Sadd, Doha, Qatar
- Address: Al Jadeed Street
- Opened: 9 July 2016; 10 years ago
- Developer: Al Mana Group
- Owner: Hamad bin Jassim bin Jaber Al Thani
- Architect: Ibrahim Jaidah Architects & Engineers
- Num. of stores: 500
- Floor area: 40,000 square metres (430,000 ft^{2})
- Parking: 1,500 parking
- Website: mirqabmall.com

Al Mirqab Mall (Arabic: المرقاب مول) is a shopping mall in the Al Sadd neighborhood of Doha, Qatar. The mall has over 500 stores and service outlets selling goods including clothes, shoes, cosmetics, jewelry, textiles, handicrafts and musical instruments.
