= Galerija Centrs =

Shopping center in Riga, Latvia

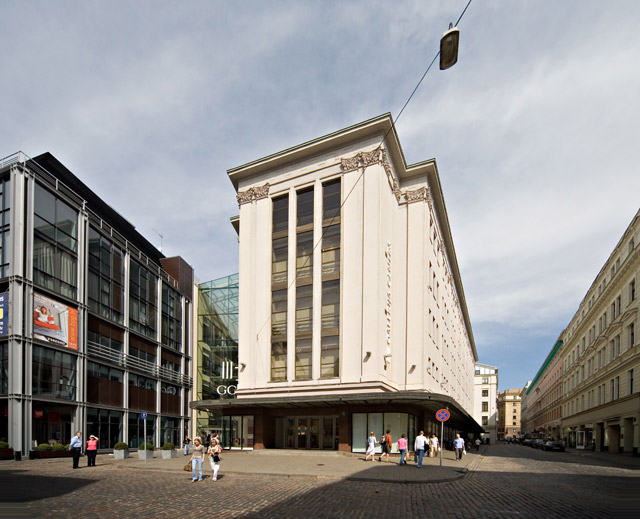
- Location: Riga, Latvia
- Coordinates: 56°56′52″N 24°06′45″E
- Address: Audēju street 16
- Opened: 1938
- Owner: Newsec
- Website: www.galerijacentrs.lv/en

Galerija Centrs is a shopping centre in Riga, Latvia. The centre opened in 1938 and presently occupies nearly an entire block in the historic Vecrīga neighborhood. The centre is 29 000 sq. m in size, and contains 110 shops.

== History ==
The centre in its earliest form was the Armijas ekonomiskais veikals (Army Economy Store), founded in 1919. In 1926, the store was moved to 16 Audēju street, into the building known as Princeses spīķeris ("Princess Warehouse").

In order to accommodate expansion of the Army Economy Store, work started on 26 September 1936 to construct a new building. Kārlis Ulmanis, President and Prime Minister of Latvia, laid the foundation stone.

On the 5th floor of "Galerija Centrs" there is a historically renovated hall "Astoria", which used to house the restaurant "Astoria", which could accommodate up to 250 guests. Next door was a hairdresser and a staff canteen. The 5th floor was connected by stairs, which were intended separately for visitors, staff, and economic needs. There were also four visitor elevators and one goods elevator.

The centre underwent major reconstruction in 2006 that included the addition of a glass roof over Rīdzenes street.

In June 2019, Galerija Centrs was sold by Linstow Center Management to Baltic Horizon Fund for 75 million euros.

== Awards ==
In 2008, the centre was recognized by the International Council of Shopping Centers (ICSC) with its international award for the best design project in the "Renovation and Expansion of an Existing Project" category.
