= List of shopping malls in Lebanon =

This is the list of shopping malls in Lebanon.

== Beirut ==
- ABC Mall Ashrafieh
- ABC Mall Verdun
- Beirut Souks

== Greater Beirut ==
- ABC Department Store, Dbayeh
- Beirut Mall, Chyah
- Centre Galaxy, Chyah
- City Center Beirut, Hazmiyeh
- City Mall (Previously Janane Farah Mall), Dora
- Karout Mall, Hazmiyeh
- The Spot Choueifat

== Tripoli ==
- ABC Department Store Tripoli

== Beqaa ==
- Cascada Village, Al Marj

== Saida ==
- Saida Mall

== Nabatieh ==
- The Spot Nabatieh

== Defunct ==
- LeMall Sin El Fil, Sin el Fil (closed in March 2020; later redeveloped and renamed The Sooq Avenue)
- Gibran Mall (Closed), Chyah

== See also ==
- Lists of buildings and structures in Lebanon
- Retailing in Lebanon
