= List of shopping malls in Cambodia =

This is the list of shopping malls in Cambodia.

== Phnom Penh ==
- AEON Mall Phnom Penh
- AEON Mall Sensok
- AEON Mall Mean Chay
- Sorya Shopping Center
- Chip Mong 271 Mega Mall
- Chip Mong Noro Mall
- Chip Mong Sensok Mall
- FUN Mall
- Exchange Square
- The Olympia Mall
- Eden Garden Mall
- Samai Square
- TK Avenue Mall
- New Steung Mean Chey Market
- Midtown Mall
- K Mall
- Khalandale Mall

== Siem Reap ==
- The Heritage Walk
- Lucky Mall Siem Reap

== Sihanoukville ==
- The Prince Mall
- FURI Times Square Mall
