= List of shopping malls in San Marino =

This is an alphabetical list of shopping centres in San Marino:

- Atlante Shopping Center, via Tre Settembre, Dogana (about 40 shops)
- Azzurro Shopping Center, via Marino Moretti, Serravalle - San Marino's biggest shopping center (Conad + 40 shops)
- The Market San Marino Outlet Experience, via Fondo Ausa, Falciano - San Marino's biggest factory outlet (about 50 shops)
- Electronics Shopping Center, via Marino Moretti, Serravalle (Dpiù + 5 shops)
- San Marino Centro Commerciale, via del Passetto, Fiorentino (Coal + 10 shops)
