= List of shopping malls in Argentina =

This article is a list of shopping malls in Argentina, locally referred to as "shopping centers".

== Buenos Aires (city) ==
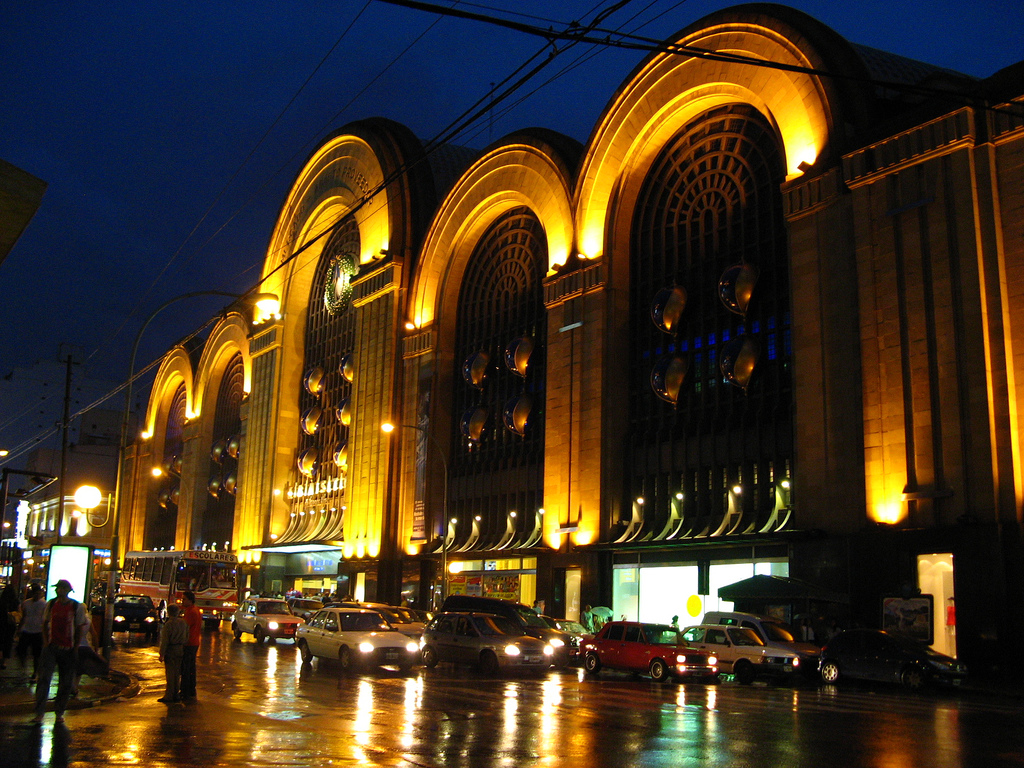
The Abasto is famous for being in the area where the tango singer Carlos Gardel lived for most of his life.

- Abasto de Buenos Aires
- Alto Palermo
- Buenos Aires Design
- Del Parque Shopping
- Devoto Shopping
- Dot Baires
- El Solar Shopping
- Galería Güemes
- Galerías Pacífico
- Paseo Alcorta
- Paseo La Plaza
- Patio Bullrich
- Plaza Liniers Shopping Center
- Village Caballito
- Village Recoleta

== Buenos Aires (province) ==
- Alto Avellaneda (Avellaneda)
- Bahía Blanca Plaza Shopping (Bahía Blanca)
- Las Palmas del Pilar (Pilar)
- Los Gallegos Shopping (Mar del Plata)
- Maschwitz Mall (Ingeniero Maschwitz)
- Nine Shopping (Moreno)
- Norcenter (Vicente López)
- Nordelta Centro Comercial (Tigre)
- Paseo Pilar (Pilar)
- Plaza Oeste (Morón)
- San Justo Shopping (San Justo)
- Soleil (San Isidro)
- Tortugas Open Mall (Tortuguitas)
- Unicenter (Martínez)

== Catamarca ==
- Catamarca Shopping Terminal (San Fernando del Valle de Catamarca)

== Chaco ==
- Sarmiento Shopping Mall (Resistencia)

== Chubut ==
- Portal de Madryn (Puerto Madryn)

== Córdoba ==
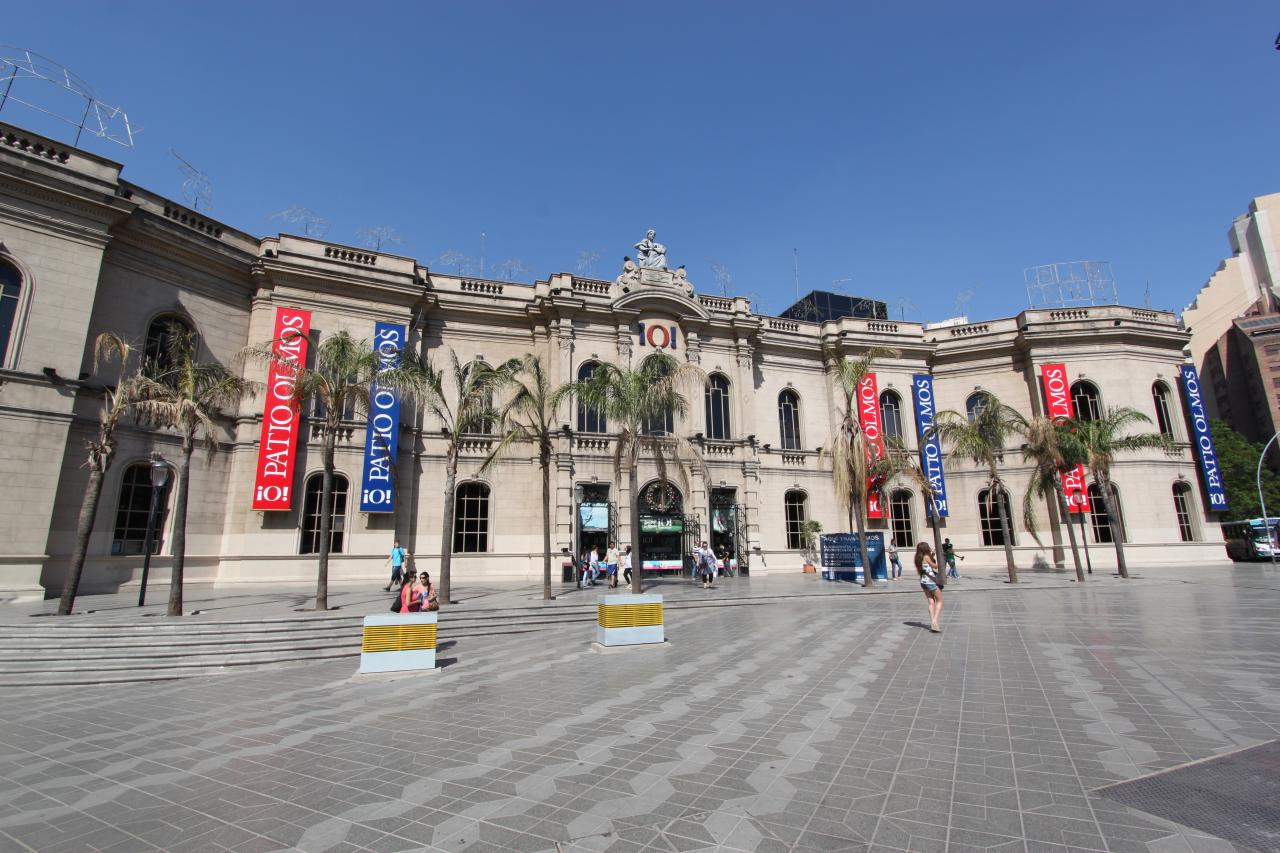
Patio Olmos is an architecturally significant shopping mall in Córdoba.

- Córdoba Shopping (Córdoba)
- Dinosaurio Mall (Córdoba)
- Nuevocentro (Córdoba)
- Paseo Rivera Indarte (Córdoba)
- Patio Olmos (Córdoba)
- Villa Allende Shopping (Villa Allende, Córdoba, Argentina)
- Paseo del Jockey (Córdoba)Inicio

== Corrientes ==
- Centenario Shopping (Corrientes)

== Jujuy ==
- Annuar Shopping (San Salvador de Jujuy)

== Mendoza ==
- Mendoza Plaza Shopping (Guaymallén)
- Palmares Open Mall (Godoy Cruz)
- Barraca Mall (Guaymallén)

== Misiones ==
- Duty Free Shop Puerto Iguazú (Puerto Iguazú)
- Posadas Plaza Shopping (Posadas)
- Punto Iguazú (Puerto Iguazú)

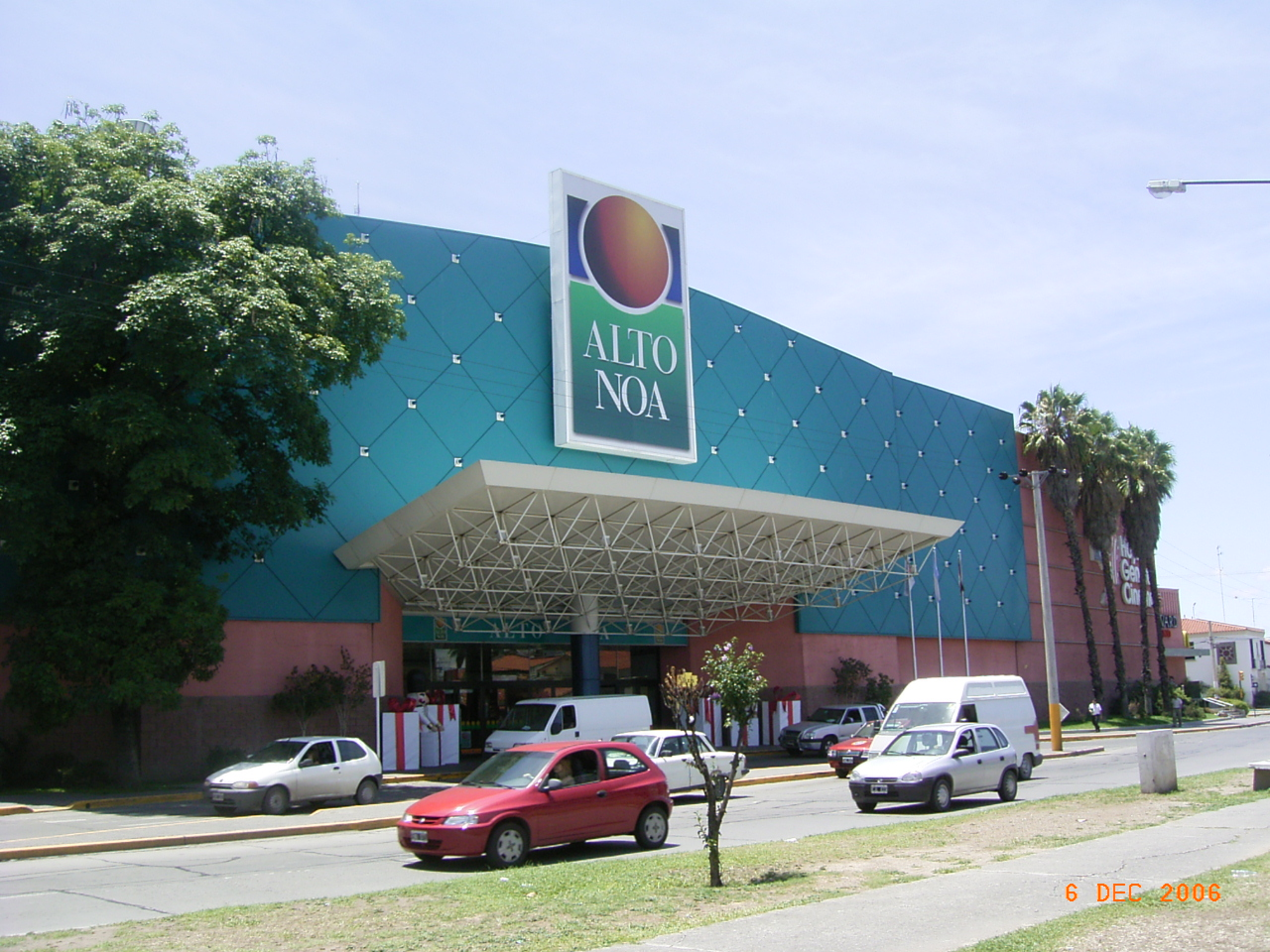
Alto NOA Shopping in Salta city

== Neuquén ==
- Portal Patagonia (Neuquén)

== Salta ==
- Alto NOA Shopping (Salta)
- El Palacio Galerías (Salta)

== Santa Fe ==
- Alto Rosario (Rosario)
- Portal Rosario (Rosario)
- Shopping del Siglo (Rosario)

== Tucumán ==
- Portal Tucumán (Yerba Buena)
- Solar del Cerro (Yerba Buena)
- Yerba Buena Shopping (Yerba Buena)
