= Tal Chowk =

Road in Gandaki, Nepal

Arghaun Chowk ताल चोक
- Location in Nepal Arghaun Chowk (Nepal)
- Coordinates: 28.1635°N 84.0577°E
- Country: Nepal
- Province: Gandaki
- City: Pokhara
- Time zone: +5:45 (Nepali Time)

Tal Chowk (Nepali: ताल चोक) consists of a three-way junction road and its surrounding area, located in Ward Number 27 of Pokhara, Nepal.

== Boundaries of Tal Chowk ==
East: Annapurna Chowk
West: Rithepani
North: Dadanaak
South: Bhandadik

== Office ==
- Ward No 27 office.

== Educational Facilities ==
- Laxmi Adarsha School
- Diamond Secondary School
- Triveny Public Secondary School

== Banks ==
- Nabil Bank.
- NIC Asia Bank.
- Agricultural Development Bank.
- NCC Bank.
- Kailash Bank
- Jyoti bikash bank limited
- Green Development Bank
- Prabhu Bank

== Health Care ==
- Shishuwa Hospital.

== Communication ==
ISPs available in Tal Chowk include:

- Worldlink.
- Nepal Telecom.
- Vianet.
- Classic Tech.

== Transportation ==
Privately run public transport systems operate throughout the city, adjoining townships and nearby villages. Public transport mainly consists of local and city buses, micro-buses, and metered-taxis.

Public buses in the city follow a color/size coded system:

- Pokhara Mahanagar Bus (colors: green, brown and blue)
- Bindabashini Samiti (colors: blue)
- Lekhnath Bus Bebasaya Samiti (colors: green and white)
- Phewa Bus Bebasaya Samiti (size: mini-micro)
