= List of shopping malls in Belgium =

The following are the largest Belgian shopping centers or malls, in terms of Gross Leasable Area (industry standard measurement). Therefore, the list excludes 'mini malls' or shopping galleries like for example the Royal Saint-Hubert Galleries.

Brussels

- Basilix Shopping Center, in Berchem-Sainte-Agathe, has a retail space of 18.683 m^{2} containing 65 shops.
- City2 shopping mall is located on the Rue Neuve/Nieuwstraat. With 104 shops on a surface of 51.000 m^{2} it is the biggest inner city shopping mall in Belgium.
- Docks Bruxsel has 110 shops and restaurants and a cinema with 8 halls, on a total commercial surface area of 41.000 m^{2}
- The W Shopping, also known as Woluwe Shopping Center, in Woluwe-Saint-Lambert, has 130 shops with a commercial surface of 45.000 m^{2}.
- Westland Shopping Center, in Anderlecht, has a total of 140 stores with a commercial surface area of 38.000 m^{2}.
- The Mint in the city centre

Charleroi

- Ville 2 located in the city centre has around 140 shops, restaurants, and cinema.
- Rive Gauche is the newest shopping mall in Charleroi, has 95 shops on a commercial area of 39.000 m^{2}.

Genk

- Shopping 1 is the first indoor shopping mall established in Belgium. It is located in Genk, Limburg province. The commercial area is 27.100 m^{2} divided into 95 shop-spaces.

Kortrijk

- 'K' in Kortrijk is located in Kortrijk, has 95 shops on a commercial area of 34.000 m^{2}.
- Ring Shopping Kortrijk Noord has 80 shops and a commercial area of 35.000 m^{2}.

Liège

- Belle-Île has around 56 shops and a commercial area of 30,279 m^{2}.
- Galeries St Lambert has a surface area of 44,000 m^{2}.
- Médiacité, the biggest shopping mall in Wallonia, has 124 stores covering 45,000 m^{2} area.

Louvain-La-Neuve

- L'Esplanade (42.000 m^{2})

Maasmechelen

- M2 shopping center

Mons

- Les Grands Prés, over 75 shops and restaurants (27.000 m^{2})

Nivelles

- Shopping Nivelles, located in the Walloon Brabant city, 25 kilometers south of Brussels.

Sint-Niklaas

- Waasland Shopping Center, the second-largest mall in Belgium is located in the Waasland region, 26 km south-west of Antwerp. Its commercial surface of 57.000 m^{2} covers 140 shops.

Tournai

- Les Bastions (43,500 m^{2}) with 102 shops inside.

Wijnegem

- Wijnegem Shopping Center, in Wijnegem just east of Antwerp, the largest mall in the Benelux in both size and number of shops, with 61.913 m^{2} of retail area and 250 shop-spaces.
