= List of shopping malls in Zimbabwe =

This is a list of notable shopping centres in Zimbabwe.

== Bulawayo ==
- Bulawayo Centre
- Ilanga Mall

== Harare ==
- Eastgate Centre
- Joina City
