= Portanova (Osijek) =

Croatian shopping center

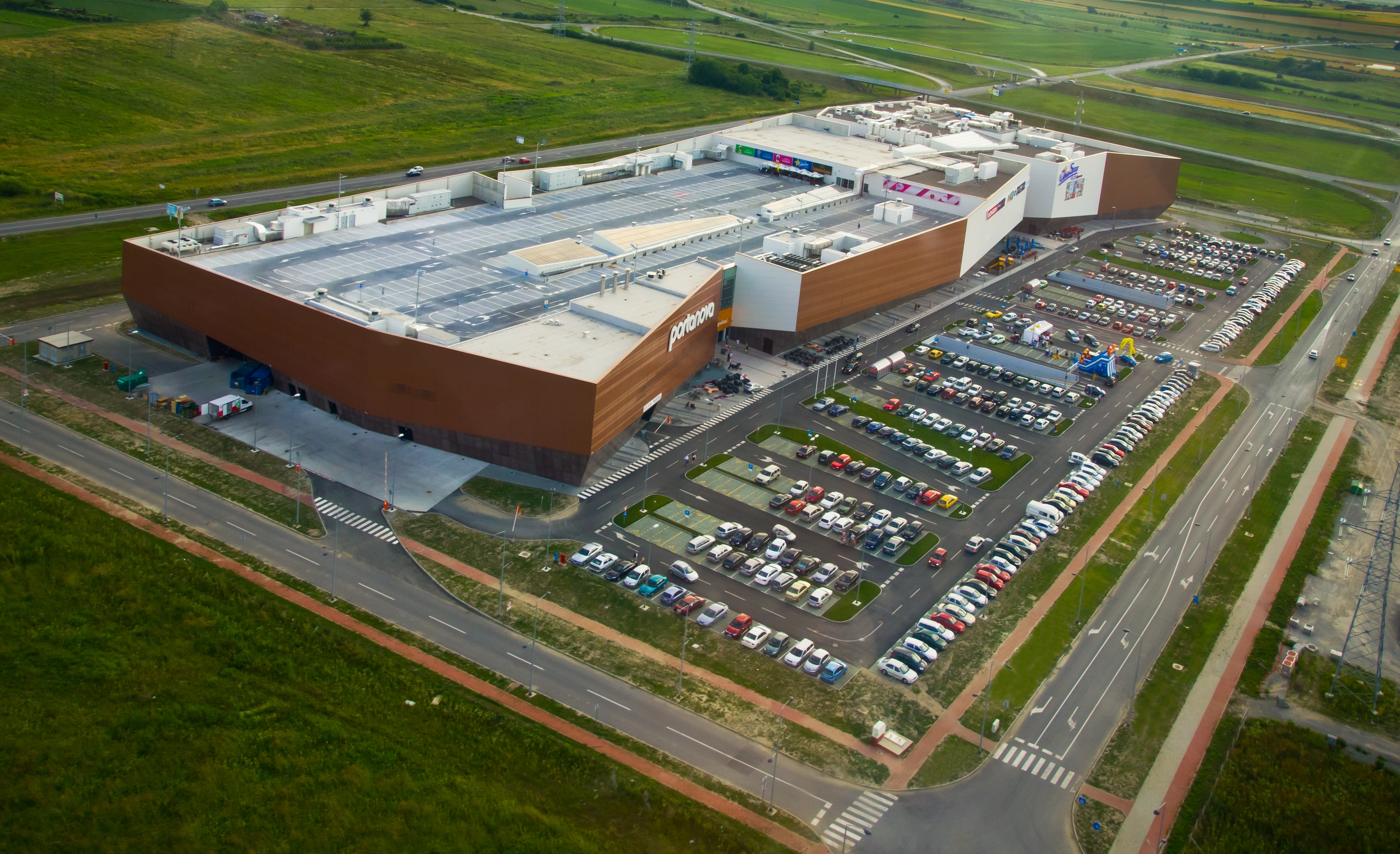
- Location: Osijek, Croatia
- Coordinates: 45°33′19″N 18°38′16″E
- Address: Svilajska 31a
- Opened: 23 March 2011
- Developer: Amplitudo d.o.o.
- Num. of stores: 100+
- Floor area: 40,240 m^{2} (433,100 sq ft)
- Floors: 3
- Parking: 1,600+
- Website: www.portanova.hr

Portanova is a shopping center in the western part of Osijek, a city in eastern Croatia. According to the International Council of Shopping Centers, Portanova has a size of 7,900 m^{2} (85,000 sq ft) with 40,240 m^{2} (433,100 sq ft) of gross leasable area (GLA). This area serves as a regional center and has a catchment population including parts of Croatia as well as Hungary, Bosnia and Herzegovina, and Serbia.

== History ==
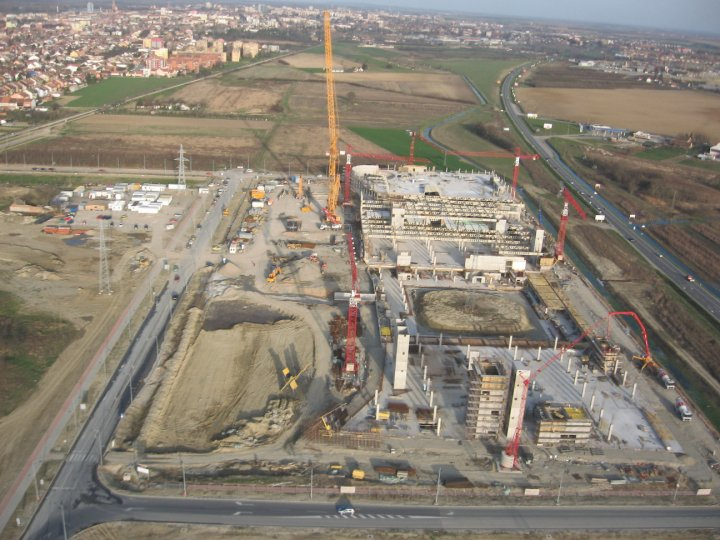
Building sites of Portanova.

The initial concept and planning for building a center began in 2007, with the site development work beginning on May 15, 2009 after all permits were granted.

The financial investor in Portanova Shopping Center is Amplitudo d.o.o., while the development work was carried out by multiple teams from different companies. Teams that were involved in the project include CBRE, Mace Grup Ltd, Studio XXL, Chapman Taylor Architetti, and Gradnja (from Osijek). When Portanova shopping center opened its doors to the public on March 24, 2011, it was the sixth largest shopping center in Croatia.

The name of the center, Portanova or “new door,” reflects a term that is based on both the local environment and the site's location on the western entrance to the City of Osijek.

Gross floor area is 79,000 m^{2} (850,000 sq ft) while the GLA is 40,240 m^{2} (433,100 sq ft). The center has been designed with three levels (two of which are for commercial and retail use with the remaining one for leisure use). There are just over 1,600 free parking spaces located at the site split between the center's underground garage parking, the land surrounding the center, and the center's roof.

== Architecture ==
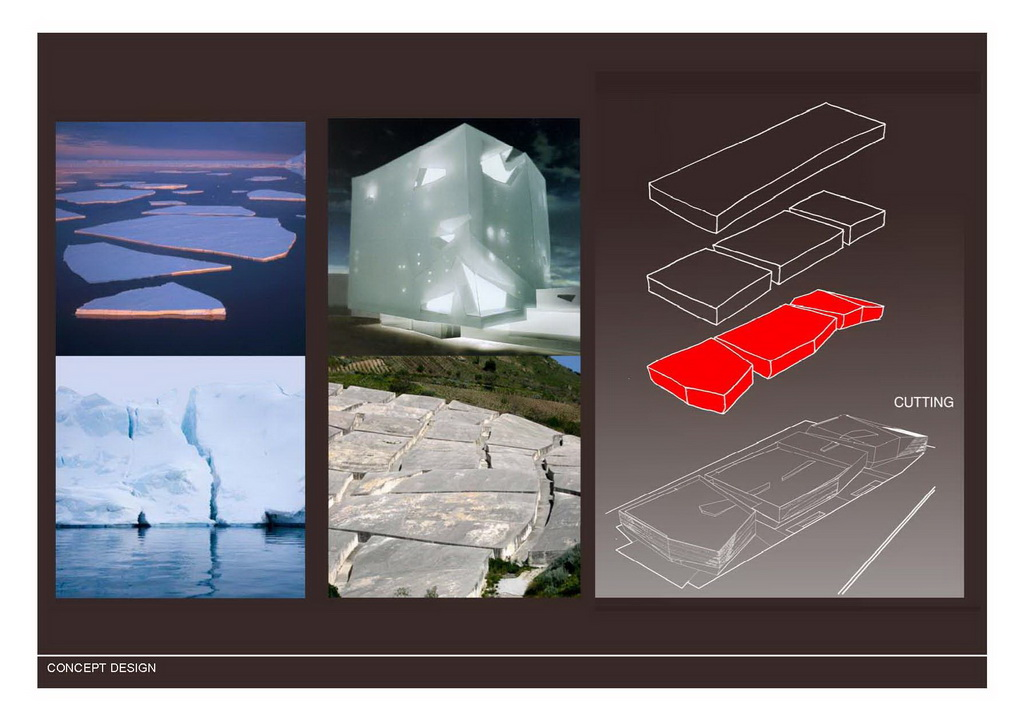
Architecture designs and concepts for the site.

The structure was developed in a longitudinal shape with an overall size of 20,000 m^{2} (220,000 sq ft). The height of the structure ranges from 15 to 22 m (49 to 72 ft), increasing from one side to the other through the ground floor, 1st and 2nd floor, and the basement garage. The building was constructed mostly from concrete and steel, utilizing dark brown concrete panels and copper metal sheets which contrast with white-colored cement sheets.

The main vision for the project was to develop a sculptural building that integrates into the urban landscape while presenting a high visual impact in accordance with the principles of contemporary minimalistic architecture.

The building takes the shape of an enormous rock set on the ground, with entrances located in areas where it appears as though pieces of the rock-face have been broken off. The cuts in the rock define three distinct volumes linked together by the shopping malls, which form the core of the building.

=== Interior ===
The malls on the ground and first floor connect two piazzas where the entrances and vertical connections (e.g., elevators) are situated, leading to the shops and anchor stores. Due to the design, every unit in the center has a high shop front and an equal width proportional to its area. Additionally, the longitudinal shape of the building ensures that every shop is oriented towards the central area of the mall, making it easy for visitors to locate every store in the center.

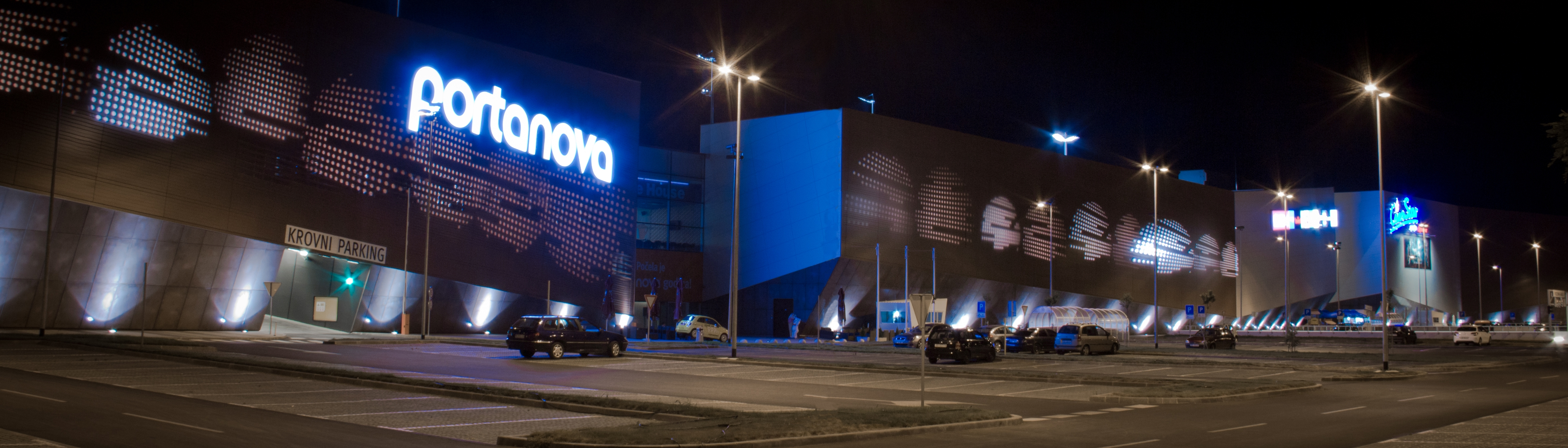
Portanova at night.

== Shops ==
While there are a wide range of retail establishments within Portanova, some anchor tenants that distinguish themselves from other tenants include Konzum Hypermarket, H&M, Müller, Zara, C&A, NewYorker, and Blitz-Cinestar multiplex cinema. The Blitz-Cinestar cinema is part of the entertainment section which is located on the second floor and also contains a bowling alley, a casino, and gastronomy services.

== Location ==
Portanova Shopping Center is located 4.5 km (2.8 mi) to the west of Osijek city center, with a regularly scheduled bus service connecting the center with the city. Portanova is also readily accessible via the southern bypass and access roads, which enables almost 600,000 people to reach the center with a one-hour drive.

The shopping center is located in the Osijek metropolitan area which makes it iaccessible from all of eastern Slavonia and Baranja, including the cities of Valpovo (25 km (16 mi)), Belišće (28 km (17 mi)), Beli Manastir (32 km (20 mi)), Vinkovci (40 km (25 mi)), Vukovar (47 km (29 mi)), and Našice (51 km (32 mi)) away.

== See also ==
- International Council of Shopping Centers
