= Ikeja City Mall =

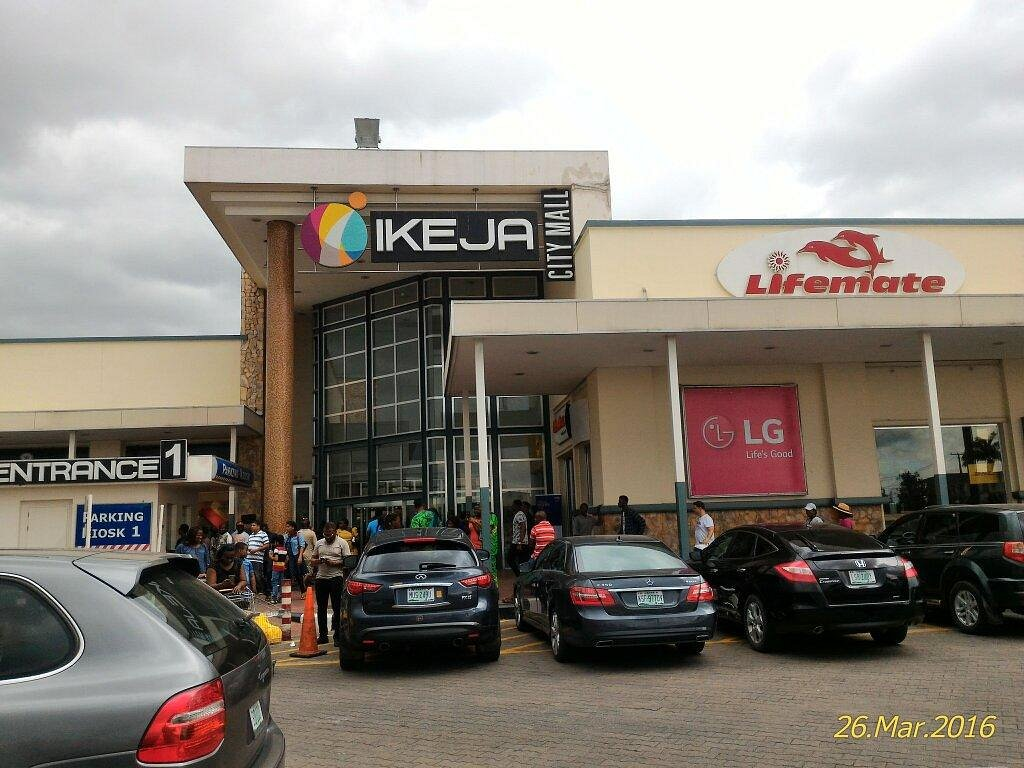
- Location: Alausa, Ikeja, Lagos State, Nigeria
- Coordinates: 6.5833°N 3.3333°E
- Opened: 14 December 2011
- Developer: Broll Property Services Limited
- Owner: Broll Property Services Limited
- Num. of stores: 90+
- Num. of anchor tenants: 3
- Floor area: 23,000 m^{2} (250,000 sq ft)
- Floors: 2
- Website: ikejacitymall.com.ng

The Ikeja City Mall is located at Alausa in Ikeja, Lagos State. It is the first of its kind on the Mainland of Metropolitan Lagos. There is a Silverbird Cinema in the mall as well as Shoprite, eateries, clothing brands and clothing stores and different bank ATMs.

Popularly known as Shoprite Ikeja or ICM, it serves as a meeting point or recreational spot for friends, family and business people.

== Construction ==
The Ikeja City Mall construction commenced in May 2010, and was initially scheduled to open for trade in November 2011, but opened at a slightly later date in December. A section of the building collapsed on Thursday, 9 December 2010 and seriously injured five people.

== Description ==
The shopping center has a 5-screen Silverbird Cinemas (the first and only cinema theatre in Ikeja as at when the mall was constructed in 2011) and a Shoprite Supermarket. It also includes specialist facilities for department stores, banks, cafés, bars, restaurants, hairdressing / beauty salon, ice-skating arena, etc.

== Expansion ==
To better serve consumers, the Ikeja City Mall, home to international and local brands, is set to add new sections to the mall. The new sections, according to the Centre Manager, will include a children's section and a cinema hall, food court, to make the mall a destination point that caters for all members of the family.

== June 2012 shutdown ==
All the stores in the mall shut down on 12 June 2012 in protest against the new parking fee of N300 per hour implemented by the mall administrators.
