= Polo Park Mall =

- Location: Enugu, Enugu, Nigeria
- Opened: 15 September 2011
- Developer: Persianas Group
- Owner: Broll Property Services Limited
- Num. of anchor tenants: 6
- Floors: 3
- Website: www.thepoloparkmallmall.com

The Polo Park Mall is a shopping mall in central Enugu, in Enugu State, Nigeria.

The mall was opened by the Persianas Group and the Enugu State Government on September 15, 2011.

It has a total retail area of 22,500 m^{2} (242,000 sq ft) and is classified as a "first world-class shopping mall" in Nigeria.
