= 2021 GT Challenge at VIR =

Eleventh round of the 2021 IMSA SportsCar Championship Season

Track map of VIR

The 2021 Michelin GT Challenge at VIR was a sports car race sanctioned by the International Motor Sports Association (IMSA). The race was held at Virginia International Raceway in Alton, Virginia on October 9, 2021. The race was the eleventh round of the 2021 IMSA SportsCar Championship, and the eighth round of the WeatherTech Sprint Cup.

== Background ==
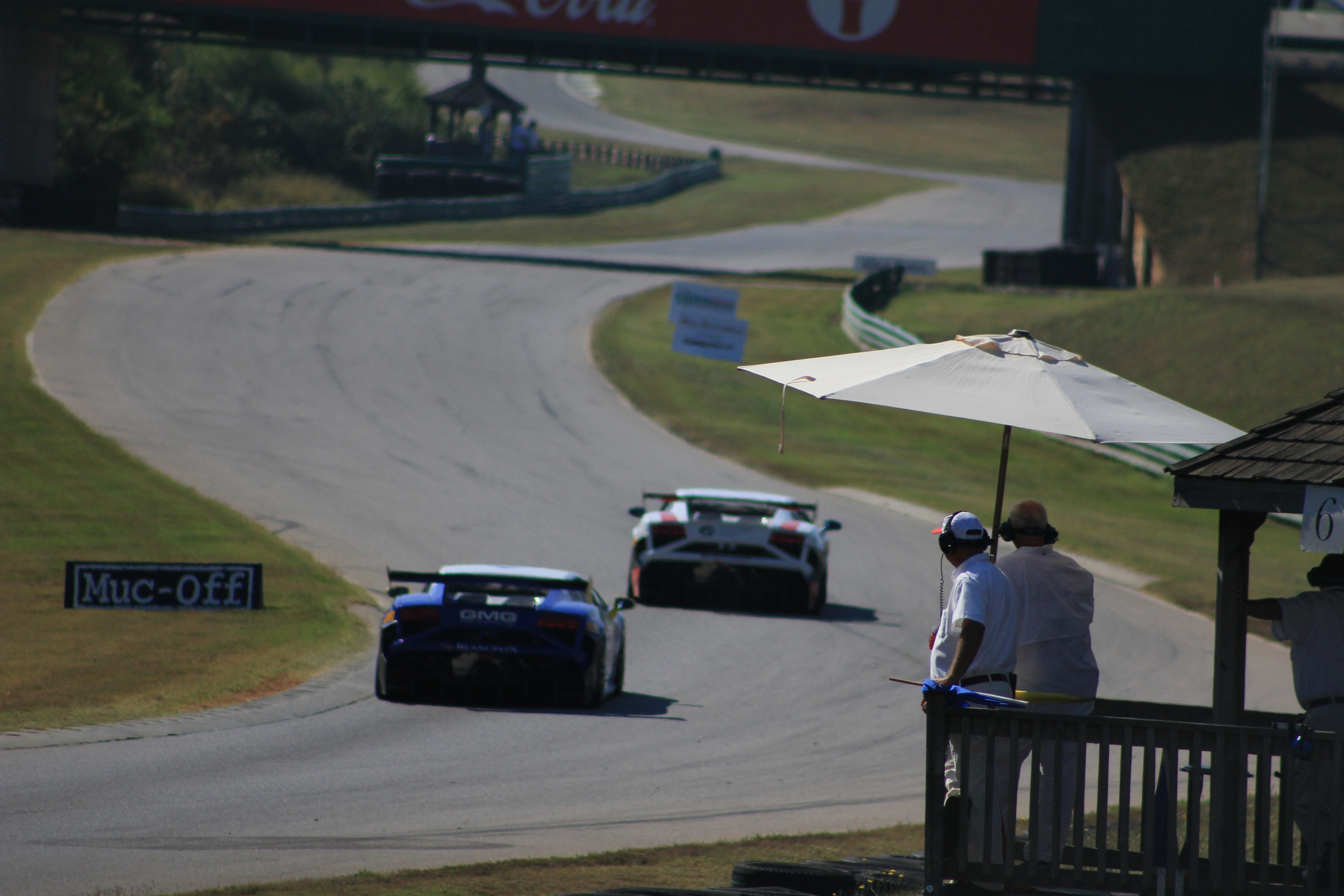
Virginia International Raceway, where the race was held.

International Motor Sports Association's (IMSA) president John Doonan confirmed the race was part of the schedule for the 2021 IMSA SportsCar Championship (IMSA SCC) in September 2020. It was the eighth consecutive year it was part of the IMSA SCC. The 2021 Michelin GT Challenge at VIR was the eleventh of twelve sports car races of 2021 by IMSA, and it was the eighth round held as part of the WeatherTech Sprint Cup. The race was held at the seventeen-turn 3.270 mi (5.263 km) Virginia International Raceway in Alton, Virginia. As in previous years, the event was also the second GT-only round of the IMSA SportsCar Championship season, in which only the GTLM and GTD classes were scheduled to compete.

Originally scheduled to run on August 22, 2021, the race was set to clash with the 24 Hours of Le Mans after the event was postponed from its original date in June to August. As a result, IMSA rescheduled the event to October 9, 2021, and moved Petit Le Mans to November 13, 2021.

On September 30, 2021, IMSA released the latest technical bulletin outlining Balance of Performance for the event. In GTD, the Lexus RC F GT3 received a 10 kilogram weight break. No changes were made in GTLM.

Before the race, Antonio García and Jordan Taylor led the GTLM Drivers' Championship with 2917 points, 160 points ahead of Tommy Milner and Nick Tandy followed by Cooper MacNeil in third. With 2570 points, the GTD Drivers' Championship was led by Zacharie Robichon and Laurens Vanthoor, ahead of Madison Snow and Bryan Sellers. Chevrolet and Porsche were leading their respective Manufacturers' Championships, while Corvette Racing and Pfaff Motorsports each led their own Teams' Championships.

=== Entries ===
A total of 18 cars took part in the event, split across 2 classes. 3 cars were entered in GTLM, and 15 in GTD. In GTLM, Kévin Estre would be joining Cooper MacNeil in the #79 WeatherTech Racing entry. GTD saw various changes after the previous round, as Alegra Motorsports would return after skipping the previous 3 rounds. Gilbert Korthoff Motorsports also returned for the first time since the Road America race with Mike Skeen partnering Guy Cosmo. Compass Racing withdrew from the event in order to focus on the Indianapolis 8 Hours. Mario Farnbacher subbed for Marc Miller, who was injured, in the Gradient Racing #66.

== Practice ==
There were two practice sessions preceding the start of the race on Saturday, both on Friday. The first session lasted one hour on Friday morning while the second session on Friday afternoon lasted 75 minutes.

=== Practice 1 ===
The first practice session took place at 8:00 am ET on Friday and ended with Kévin Estre topping the charts for WeatherTech Racing, with a lap time of 1:41.124, ahead of Nick Tandy in the No. 4 Corvette. The GTD class was topped by the No. 96 Turner Motorsport BMW M6 GT3 of Bill Auberlen with a time of 1:44.391. Franck Perera in the No. 19 Lamborghini was second fastest followed by Ross Gunn in the No. 23 Aston Martin.

Pos.	Class	No.	Team	Driver	Time	Gap
1	GTLM	79	WeatherTech Racing	Kévin Estre	1:41.124	_
2	GTLM	4	Corvette Racing	Nick Tandy	1:41.921	+0.797
3	GTLM	3	Corvette Racing	Antonio García	1:41.969	+0.845

=== Practice 2 ===
The second and final practice session took place at 11:55 am ET on Friday and ended with Kévin Estre topping the charts for WeatherTech Racing, with a lap time of 1:41.124. Tommy Milner's No. 4 Corvette was second fastest followed by Jordan Taylor in the No. 3 Corvette. The GTD class was topped by the No. 14 Vasser Sullivan Racing Lexus RC F GT3 of Jack Hawksworth with a time of 1:44.407, ahead of Ross Gunn in the No. 23 Aston Martin.

Pos.	Class	No.	Team	Driver	Time	Gap
1	GTLM	79	WeatherTech Racing	Kévin Estre	1:40.838	_
2	GTLM	4	Corvette Racing	Tommy Milner	1:41.200	+0.362
3	GTLM	3	Corvette Racing	Jordan Taylor	1:41.313	+0.475

== Qualifying ==
Qualifying was broken into two sessions. The first was for cars in the GTD class. Robby Foley qualified on pole for the class driving the No. 96 car for Turner Motorsport, beating Madison Snow in the No. 1 Lamborghini by 0.236 seconds. Trent Hindman was third in the No. 16 Wright Motorsports Porsche followed by Roman De Angelis in the No. 23 Aston Martin.

The final session of qualifying was for the GTLM and GTD classes. Tommy Milner qualified on pole in GTLM driving the No. 4 car for Corvette Racing, besting teammate Jordan Taylor in the sister No. 3 Corvette Racing entry by less than 0.010 seconds. Cooper MacNeil in the No. 79 Porsche rounded out the GTLM field. Ross Gunn set the fastest time in the GTD points paying session driving the No. 23 car for Heart of Racing Team and earned 35 championship points. Gunn was 0.141 seconds clear of teammate Alex Riberas in the sister No. 27 Heart of Racing Team Aston Martin. Jack Hawksworth was third in the No. 14 Lexus followed by Bryan Sellers in the No. 1 Lamborghini.

=== Qualifying results ===
Pole positions in each class are indicated in bold and by ‡.

Pos.	Class	No.	Team	Driver	Time	Gap	Grid
1	**GTLM**	**4**	**(United States) Corvette Racing**	**(United States) Tommy Milner**	**1:40.263**	**_**	1‡
2	GTLM	3	(United States) Corvette Racing	(United States) Jordan Taylor	1:40.266	+0.003	2
3	GTLM	79	(United States) WeatherTech Racing	(United States) Cooper MacNeil	1:41.445	+1.182	3
4	**GTD**	**96**	**(United States) Turner Motorsport**	**(United States) Robby Foley**	**1:43.809**	**+3.546**	4‡
5	GTD	1	(United States) Paul Miller Racing	(United States) Madison Snow	1:44.045	+3.782	5
6	GTD	16	(United States) Wright Motorsports	(United States) Trent Hindman	1:44.145	+3.882	17^{1}
7	GTD	23	(United States) Heart Of Racing Team	(Canada) Roman De Angelis	1:44.161	+3.898	6
8	GTD	39	(United States) CarBahn Motorsports with Peregrine Racing	(United States) Richard Heistand	1:44.230	+3.967	7
9	GTD	14	(United States) Vasser Sullivan Racing	(United States) Aaron Telitz	1:44.358	+4.095	8
10	GTD	9	(Canada) Pfaff Motorsports	(Canada) Zacharie Robichon	1:44.423	+4.160	16^{2}
11	GTD	12	(United States) Vasser Sullivan Racing	(United States) Frankie Montecalvo	1:44.447	+4.184	9
12	GTD	28	(United States) Alegra Motorsports	(United States) Michael de Quesada	1:44.712	+4.449	10
13	GTD	32	(United States) Gilbert Korthoff Motorsports	(United States) Guy Cosmo	1:44.790	+4.527	11
14	GTD	27	(United States) Heart Of Racing Team	(United Kingdom) Ian James	1:45.274	+5.011	18^{3}
15	GTD	66	(United States) Gradient Racing	(United Kingdom) Till Bechtolsheimer	1:45.662	+5.399	12
16	GTD	19	(Austria) GRT Grasser Racing Team	(Canada) Misha Goikhberg	1:45.699	+5.436	13
17	GTD	88	(United States) Team Hardpoint	(United States) Rob Ferriol	1:46.416	+6.153	14
18	GTD	44	(United States) Magnus Racing with Archangel Motorsports	(United States) John Potter	1:46.959	+6.696	15
Sources:

- ^{1} The No. 16 Wright Motorsports entry was moved to the rear of the GTD classification for violating competition rules regarding the car's ride height.
- ^{2} The No. 9 Pfaff Motorsports entry was moved to the back of the GTD classification as per Article 40.2.9. of the Sporting regulations (car was touched by the crew during qualifying without permission by the officials).
- ^{3} The No. 27 Heart of Racing Team entry was moved to the back of the GTD classification for violating competition rules regarding the car's rear wing. Additionally, the team elected to change tires after qualifying.

== Race ==
=== Post-race ===
The result kept Antonio García and Jordan Taylor atop the GTLM Drivers' Championship. With 2938 points, Robichon and Vanthoor's victory allowed them to increase their advantage over Sellers and Snow in the GTD Drivers' Championship. Long advanced from fifth to fourth while Auberlen and Foley dropped from fourth to fifth. Chevrolet and Porsche continued to top their respective Manufacturers' Championships while Corvette Racing and Pfaff Motorsports kept their respective advantages in their respective Teams' Championships with one round remaining in the season.

=== Race results ===
Class winners are denoted in bold and ‡.

Pos	Class	No.	Team	Drivers	Chassis	Laps	Time/Retired
Pos	Class	No.	Team	Drivers	Engine	Laps	Time/Retired
1	**GTLM**	**4**	**(United States) Corvette Racing**	**(United States) Tommy Milner (United Kingdom) Nick Tandy**	**Chevrolet Corvette C8.R**	**87**	**2:40:45.036‡**
1	**GTLM**	**4**	**(United States) Corvette Racing**	**(United States) Tommy Milner (United Kingdom) Nick Tandy**	**Chevrolet 5.5L V8**	**87**	**2:40:45.036‡**
2	GTLM	3	(United States) Corvette Racing	(Spain) Antonio García (United States) Jordan Taylor	Chevrolet Corvette C8.R	87	+17.852
2	GTLM	3	(United States) Corvette Racing	(Spain) Antonio García (United States) Jordan Taylor	Chevrolet 5.5L V8	87	+17.852
3	GTLM	79	(United States) WeatherTech Racing	(United States) Cooper MacNeil (France) Kévin Estre	Porsche 911 RSR-19	87	+38.655
3	GTLM	79	(United States) WeatherTech Racing	(United States) Cooper MacNeil (France) Kévin Estre	Porsche 4.2L Flat-6	87	+38.655
4	**GTD**	**9**	**(Canada) Pfaff Motorsports**	**(Canada) Zacharie Robichon (Belgium) Laurens Vanthoor**	**Porsche 911 GT3 R**	**85**	**+2 Laps‡**
4	**GTD**	**9**	**(Canada) Pfaff Motorsports**	**(Canada) Zacharie Robichon (Belgium) Laurens Vanthoor**	**Porsche 4.0L Flat-6**	**85**	**+2 Laps‡**
5	GTD	1	(United States) Paul Miller Racing	(United States) Bryan Sellers (United States) Madison Snow	Lamborghini Huracán GT3 Evo	85	+2 Laps
5	GTD	1	(United States) Paul Miller Racing	(United States) Bryan Sellers (United States) Madison Snow	Lamborghini 5.2L V10	85	+2 Laps
6	GTD	14	(United States) Vasser Sullivan Racing	(United States) Aaron Telitz (United Kingdom) Jack Hawksworth	Lexus RC F GT3	85	+2 Laps
6	GTD	14	(United States) Vasser Sullivan Racing	(United States) Aaron Telitz (United Kingdom) Jack Hawksworth	Lexus 5.0L V8	85	+2 Laps
7	GTD	16	(United States) Wright Motorsports	(United States) Trent Hindman (United States) Patrick Long	Porsche 911 GT3 R	85	+2 Laps
7	GTD	16	(United States) Wright Motorsports	(United States) Trent Hindman (United States) Patrick Long	Porsche 4.0L Flat-6	85	+2 Laps
8	GTD	23	(United States) Heart of Racing Team	(Canada) Roman De Angelis (United Kingdom) Ross Gunn	Aston Martin Vantage GT3	85	+2 Laps
8	GTD	23	(United States) Heart of Racing Team	(Canada) Roman De Angelis (United Kingdom) Ross Gunn	Mercedes-Benz M177 4.0 L Turbo V8	85	+2 Laps
9	GTD	27	(United States) Heart of Racing Team	(United Kingdom) Ian James (Spain) Alex Riberas	Aston Martin Vantage GT3	85	+2 Laps
9	GTD	27	(United States) Heart of Racing Team	(United Kingdom) Ian James (Spain) Alex Riberas	Mercedes-Benz M177 4.0 L Turbo V8	85	+2 Laps
10	GTD	39	(United States) CarBahn Motorsports with Peregrine Racing	(United States) Richard Heistand (United States) Jeff Westphal	Audi R8 LMS Evo	85	+2 Laps
10	GTD	39	(United States) CarBahn Motorsports with Peregrine Racing	(United States) Richard Heistand (United States) Jeff Westphal	Audi 5.2L V10	85	+2 Laps
11	GTD	28	(United States) Alegra Motorsports	(Canada) Daniel Morad (United States) Michael de Quesada	Mercedes-AMG GT3 Evo	85	+2 Laps
11	GTD	28	(United States) Alegra Motorsports	(Canada) Daniel Morad (United States) Michael de Quesada	Mercedes-AMG M159 6.2L V8	85	+2 Laps
12	GTD	19	(Austria) GRT Grasser Racing Team	(Canada) Misha Goikhberg (France) Franck Perera	Lamborghini Huracán GT3 Evo	85	+2 Laps
12	GTD	19	(Austria) GRT Grasser Racing Team	(Canada) Misha Goikhberg (France) Franck Perera	Lamborghini 5.2L V10	85	+2 Laps
13	GTD	88	(United States) Team Hardpoint	(United States) Rob Ferriol (United Kingdom) Katherine Legge	Porsche 911 GT3 R	85	+2 Laps
13	GTD	88	(United States) Team Hardpoint	(United States) Rob Ferriol (United Kingdom) Katherine Legge	Porsche 4.0L Flat-6	85	+2 Laps
14	GTD	32	(United States) Gilbert Korthoff Motorsports	(United States) Guy Cosmo (United States) Mike Skeen	Mercedes-AMG GT3 Evo	84	+3 Laps
14	GTD	32	(United States) Gilbert Korthoff Motorsports	(United States) Guy Cosmo (United States) Mike Skeen	Mercedes-AMG M159 6.2L V8	84	+3 Laps
15	GTD	96	(United States) Turner Motorsport	(United States) Bill Auberlen (United States) Robby Foley	BMW M6 GT3	84	+3 Laps
15	GTD	96	(United States) Turner Motorsport	(United States) Bill Auberlen (United States) Robby Foley	BMW 4.4L Turbo V8	84	+3 Laps
16	GTD	12	(United States) Vasser Sullivan Racing	(United States) Frankie Montecalvo (United States) Zach Veach	Lexus RC F GT3	83	+4 Laps
16	GTD	12	(United States) Vasser Sullivan Racing	(United States) Frankie Montecalvo (United States) Zach Veach	Lexus 5.0L V8	83	+4 Laps
17 DNF	GTD	44	(United States) Magnus Racing with Archangel Motorsports	(United States) John Potter (United States) Andy Lally	Acura NSX GT3 Evo	72	Wheel
17 DNF	GTD	44	(United States) Magnus Racing with Archangel Motorsports	(United States) John Potter (United States) Andy Lally	Acura 3.5L Turbo V6	72	Wheel
18 DNF	GTD	66	(United States) Gradient Racing	(United Kingdom) Till Bechtolsheimer (United States) Mario Farnbacher	Acura NSX GT3 Evo	39	Crash
18 DNF	GTD	66	(United States) Gradient Racing	(United Kingdom) Till Bechtolsheimer (United States) Mario Farnbacher	Acura 3.5L Turbo V6	39	Crash

== Standings after the race ==
DPi Drivers' Championship standings
Pos.	+/–	Driver	Points
1		(Portugal) Filipe Albuquerque (United States) Ricky Taylor	3071
2		(Brazil) Pipo Derani (Brazil) Felipe Nasr	3052
3		(United Kingdom) Oliver Jarvis (United Kingdom) Harry Tincknell	2882
4		(Denmark) Kevin Magnussen (Netherlands) Renger van der Zande	2879
5		(United States) Dane Cameron (France) Olivier Pla	2668

LMP2 Drivers' Championship standings
Pos.	+/–	Driver	Points
1		(Denmark) Mikkel Jensen (United States) Ben Keating	1807
2		(United States) Tristan Nunez (United States) Steven Thomas	1694
3		(France) Gabriel Aubry (Canada) John Farano	1634
4		(United Kingdom) Ryan Dalziel (United States) Dwight Merriman	1330
5		(United States) Scott Huffaker	702

LMP3 Drivers' Championship standings
Pos.	+/–	Driver	Points
1		(United States) Gar Robinson	1800
2		(United States) Jon Bennett (United States) Colin Braun	1750
3		(United States) Jim Cox (United States) Dylan Murry	1594
4		(Sweden) Rasmus Lindh	1538
5		(United States) Oliver Askew	1504

GTLM Drivers' Championship standings
Pos.	+/–	Driver	Points
1		(Spain) Antonio García (United States) Jordan Taylor	3269
2		(United States) Tommy Milner (United Kingdom) Nick Tandy	3142
3		(United States) Cooper MacNeil	2924
4		(Australia) Matt Campbell	1702
5		(France) Mathieu Jaminet	1324

GTD Drivers' Championship standings
Pos.	+/–	Driver	Points
1		(Canada) Zacharie Robichon (Belgium) Laurens Vanthoor	2938
2		(United States) Madison Snow (United States) Bryan Sellers	2888
3		(Canada) Roman De Angelis (United Kingdom) Ross Gunn	2761
4	1	(United States) Patrick Long	2659
5	1	(United States) Bill Auberlen (United States) Robby Foley	2638

- Note: Only the top five positions are included for all sets of standings.

DPi Teams' Championship standings
Pos.	+/–	Team	Points
1		(United States) #10 WTR-Konica Minolta Acura	3071
2		(United States) #31 Whelen Engineering Racing	3052
3		(Canada) #55 Mazda Motorsports	2882
4		(United States) #01 Cadillac Chip Ganassi Racing	2879
5		(United States) #60 Meyer Shank Racing w/ Curb-Agajanian	2668

LMP2 Teams' Championship standings
Pos.	+/–	Team	Points
1		(United States) #52 PR1 Mathiasen Motorsports	1807
2		(United States) #11 WIN Autosport	1694
3		(United States) #8 Tower Motorsport	1634
4		(United States) #18 Era Motorsport	1330
5		(United States) #22 United Autosports	614

LMP3 Teams' Championship standings
Pos.	+/–	Team	Points
1		(United States) #74 Riley Motorsports	1800
2		(United States) #54 CORE Autosport	1750
3		(United States) #91 Riley Motorsports	1594
4		(United States) #38 Performance Tech Motorsports	1538
5		(United States) #36 Andretti Autosport	1192

GTLM Teams' Championship standings
Pos.	+/–	Team	Points
1		(United States) #3 Corvette Racing	3269
2		(United States) #4 Corvette Racing	3142
3		(United States) #79 WeatherTech Racing	2974
4		(United States) #24 BMW Team RLL	1001
5		(United States) #25 BMW Team RLL	966

GTD Teams' Championship standings
Pos.	+/–	Team	Points
1		(Canada) #9 Pfaff Motorsports	2938
2		(United States) #1 Paul Miller Racing	2888
3		(United States) #23 Heart of Racing Team	2761
4	1	(United States) #16 Wright Motorsports	2659
5	1	(United States) #96 Turner Motorsport	2638

- Note: Only the top five positions are included for all sets of standings.

DPi Manufacturers' Championship standings
Pos.	+/–	Manufacturer	Points
1		(United States) Cadillac	3311
2		(Japan) Acura	3223
3		(Japan) Mazda	3039

GTLM Manufacturers' Championship standings
Pos.	+/–	Manufacturer	Points
1		(United States) Chevrolet	3385
2		(Germany) Porsche	3164
3		(Germany) BMW	1052
4		(Italy) Ferrari	330

GTD Manufacturers' Championship standings
Pos.	+/–	Manufacturer	Points
1		(Germany) Porsche	3077
2		(Italy) Lamborghini	3005
3		(United Kingdom) Aston Martin	2889
4		(Germany) BMW	2827
5		(Japan) Lexus	2799

- Note: Only the top five positions are included for all sets of standings.

IMSA SportsCar Championship
Previous race: 2021 Grand Prix of Long Beach	2021 season	Next race: 2021 Petit Le Mans
