= 2021 IMSA SportsCar Championship =

51st season of the racing series organized by IMSA

The 2021 IMSA SportsCar Championship (known for sponsorship reasons as the 2021 IMSA WeatherTech SportsCar Championship) was the 51st racing season sanctioned by the International Motor Sports Association (IMSA) which traces its lineage back to the 1971 IMSA GT Championship. This was also the eighth United SportsCar Championship season and sixth under the IMSA SportsCar Championship name. The series began on January 30 with the 24 Hours of Daytona, and ended on November 13 with the Petit Le Mans after 12 races.

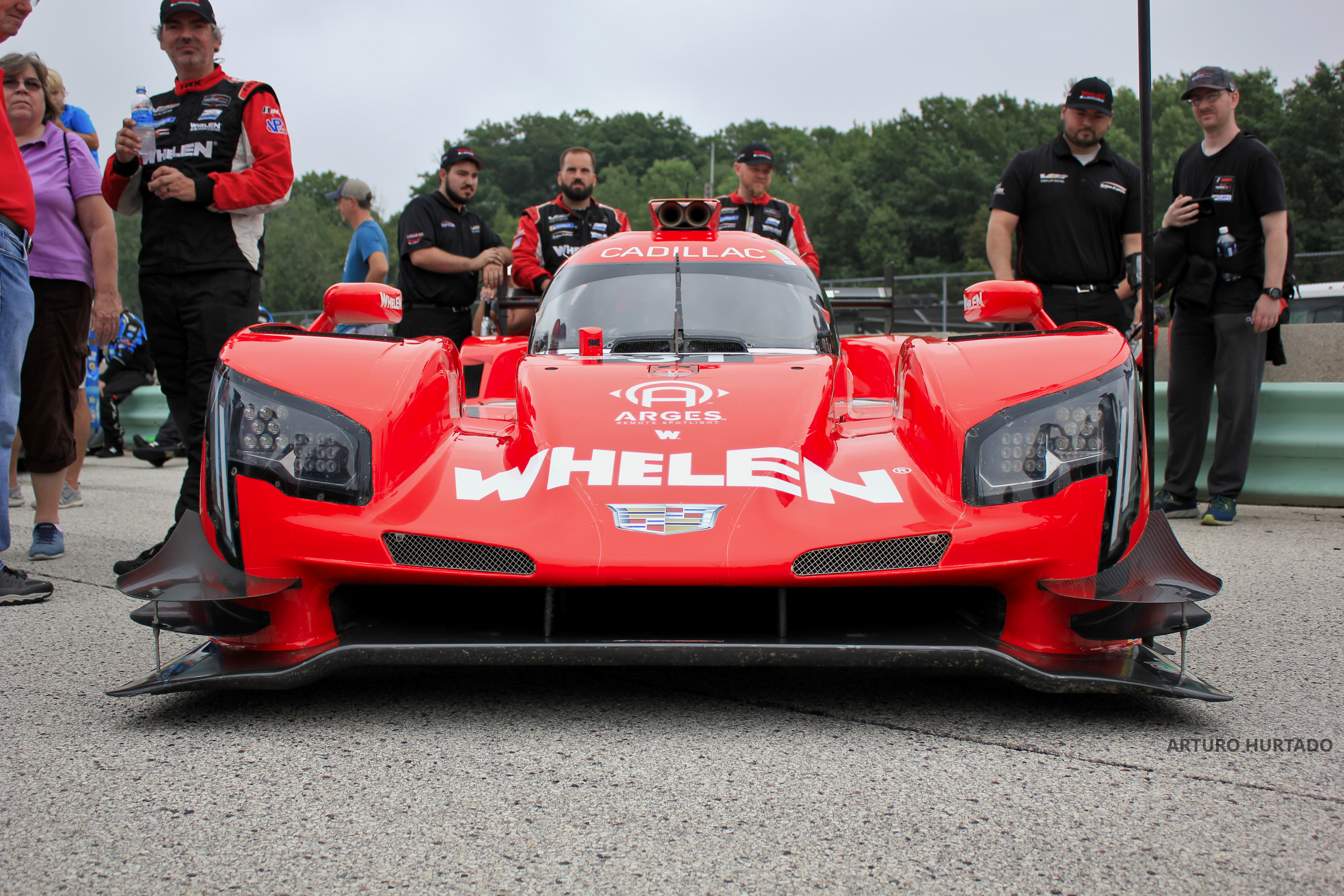
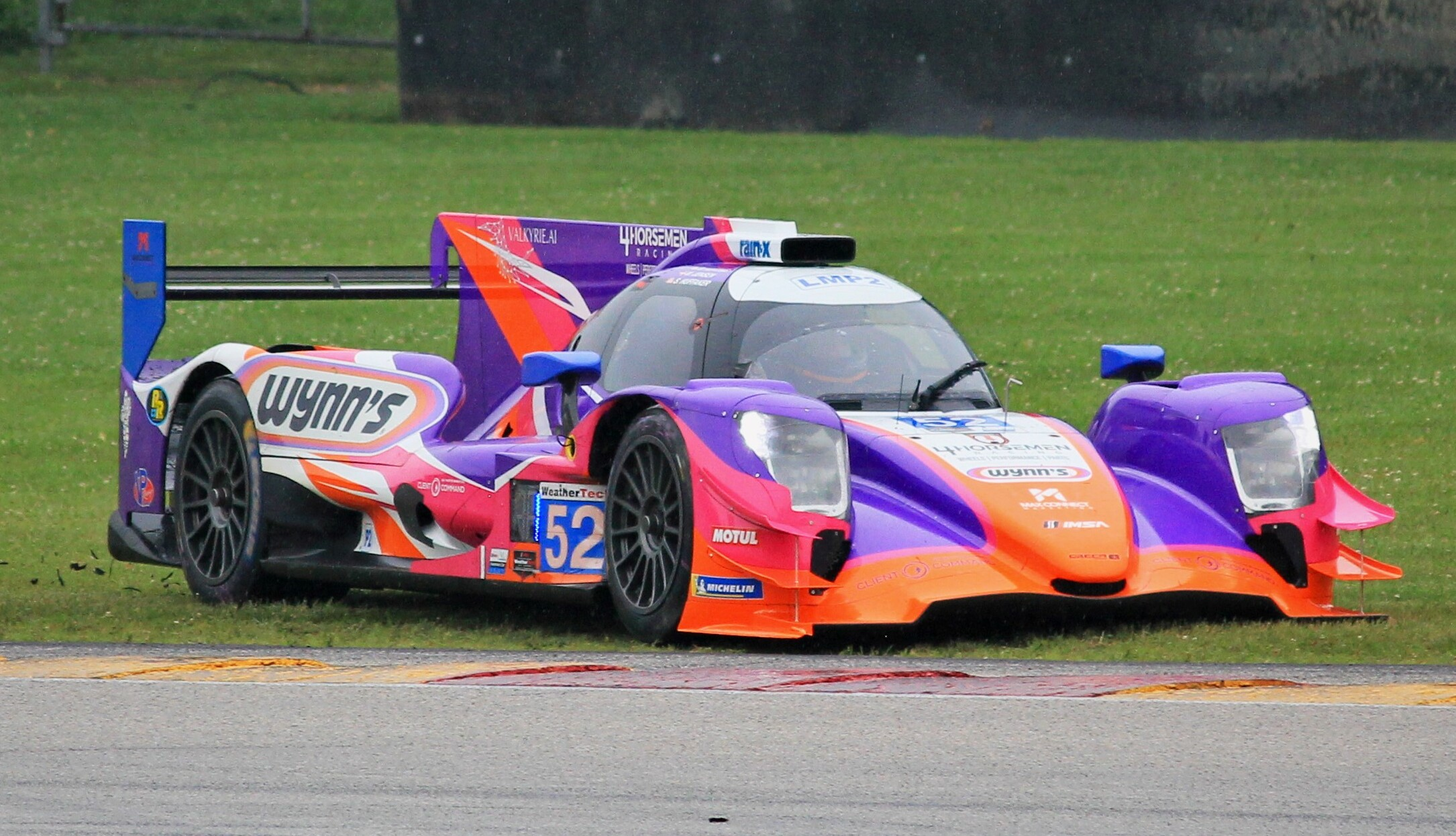
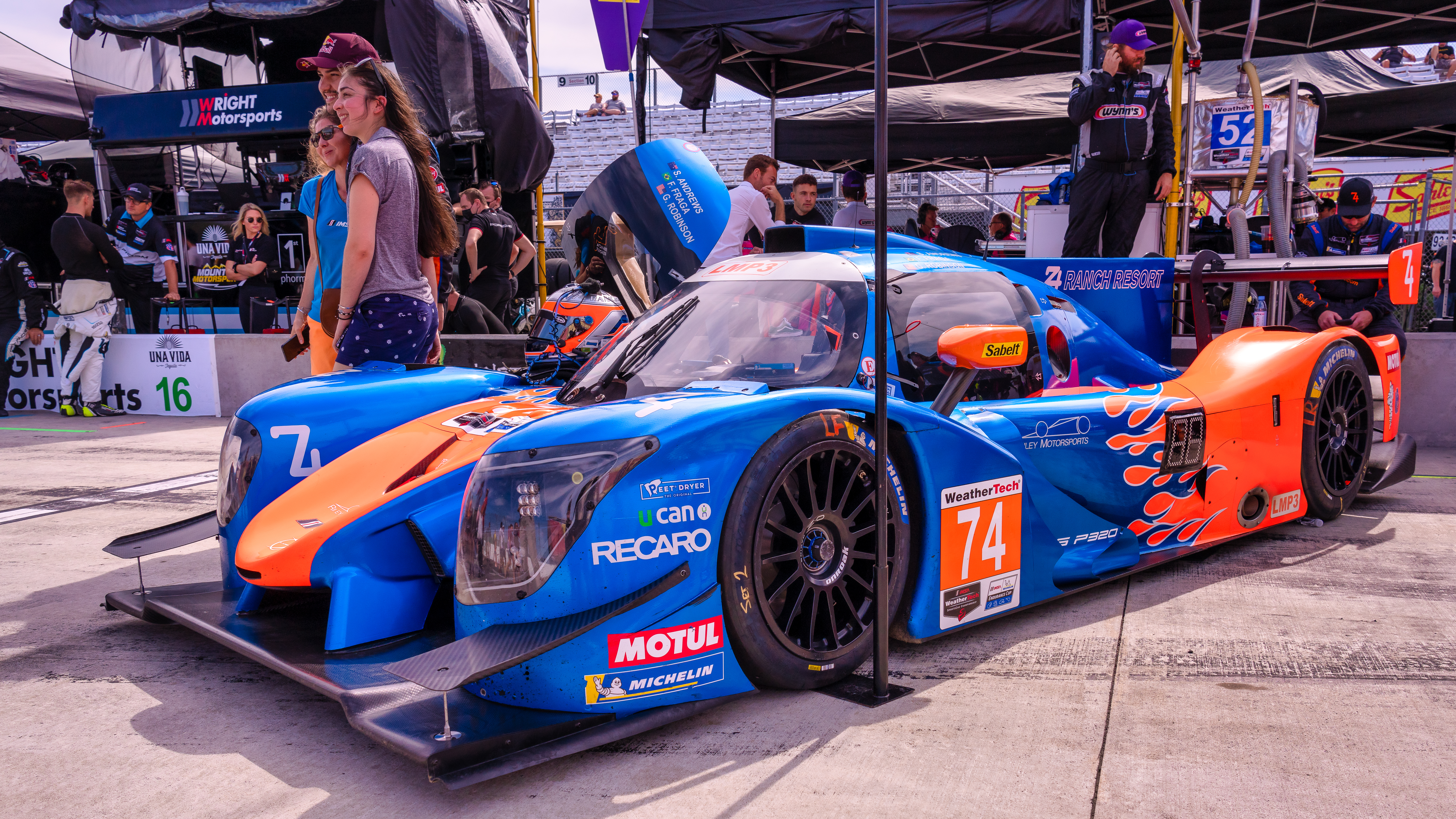
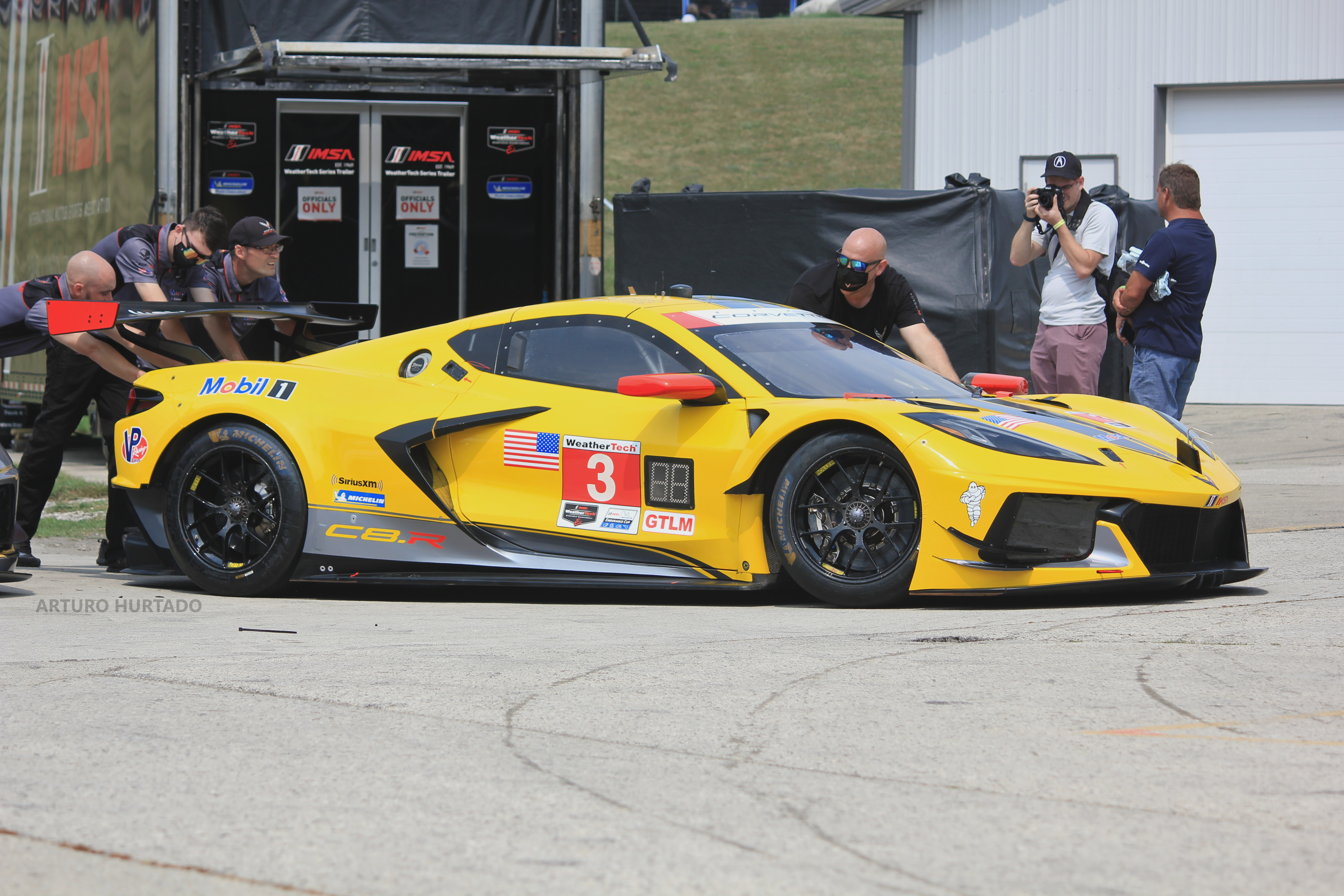
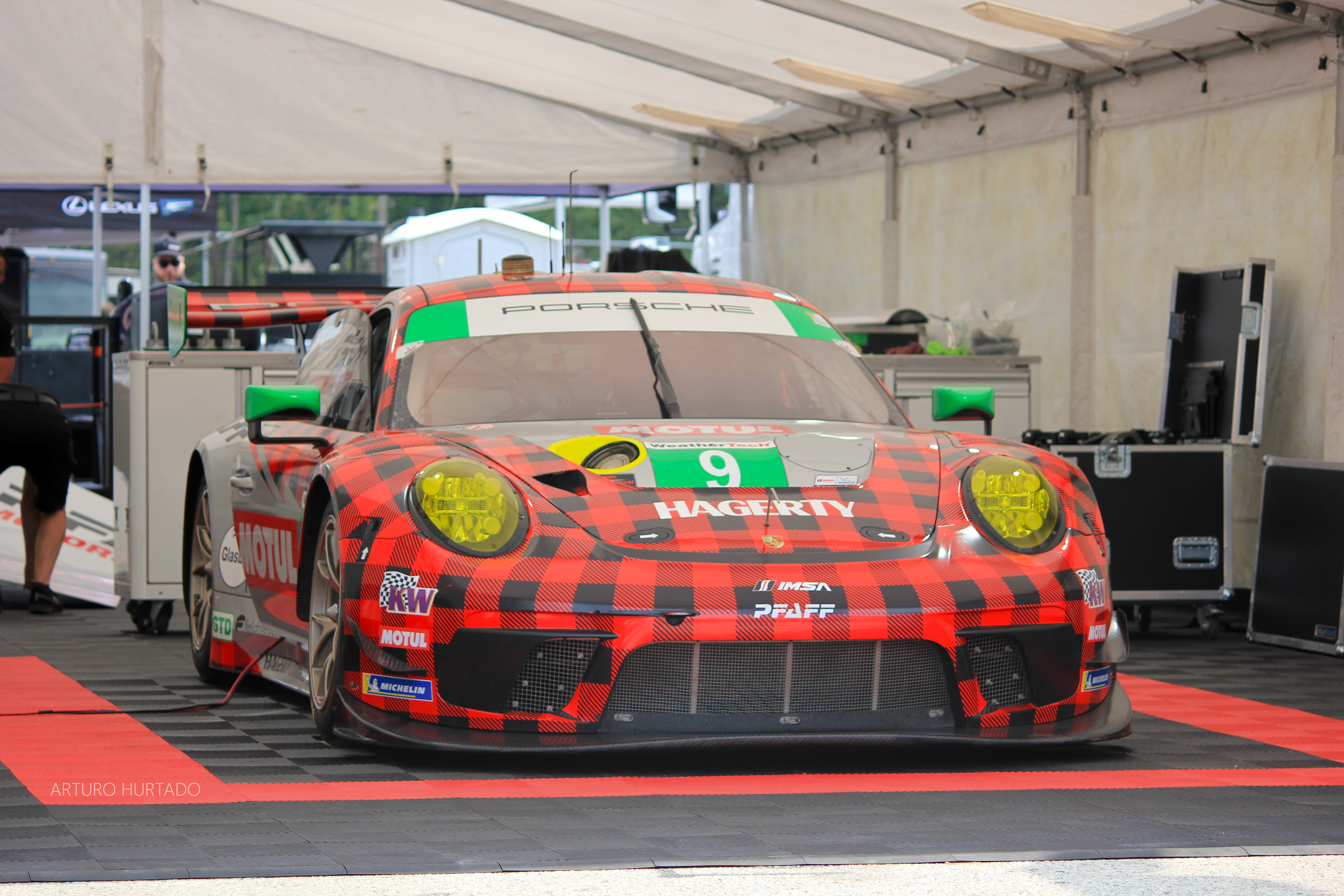
The No. 31 Action Express Racing team won the DPi Teams and Drivers' Championship, with Cadillac winning the Prototype Manufacturers' Championship. The No. 52 PR1 Mathiasen Motorsports team won the LMP2 Teams' and Drivers' Championship. The No. 74 Riley Motorsports team won the LMP3 Teams' and Drivers' Championships with their driver Gar Robinson. The No. 3 Corvette Racing team won the GTLM Teams' and Drivers' championships, with Chevrolet taking the GTLM Manufacturers' Championship title. The No. 9 Pfaff Motorsports team won the GTD Teams' and Drivers' championships, with Porsche taking the GTD Manufacturers' Championship title.

== Classes ==
- Daytona Prototype international (DPi)
- Le Mans Prototype 2 (LMP2)
- Le Mans Prototype 3 (LMP3)
- GT Le Mans (GTLM)
- GT Daytona (GTD)

For the 2021 season, a new class is set to join the class hierarchy: Le Mans Prototype 3 (LMP3), in an attempt to bolster the number of entries across each race. It is a new addition to the structure of the IMSA SportsCar Championship, having previously been the main class in one of the championships' feeder series, the IMSA Prototype Challenge.

== Rule changes ==
=== Sporting regulations ===
On September 9, 2020, IMSA announced a revamp of their points system. For the 2021 season onward, the existing points system would be used for the results of qualifying, with the same points system being multiplied by 10 for the main race. In addition, the existing amateur-based classes (LMP2 and GTD) would have a revised qualifying structure, with the session being split into two halves, with both halves requiring a different driver and set of tires to be used for qualifying. This format would be applied to the incoming LMP3 class as well.

== Schedule ==
The provisional schedule was released on September 9, 2020, and featured 12 rounds. The schedule was pending, however, because of COVID-19 regulations that may still be in effect.

On December 3, 2020, IMSA announced the addition of the "Motul Pole Award 100", a qualifying race run in conjunction with the "Roar Before the Rolex 24" preseason test. The 100-minute event awards qualifying points and sets the starting order for the Rolex 24 at Daytona. Two drivers must compete in each car, however points are awarded to all drivers on the entry list for each car. This effectively made participation in the Roar Before the 24 test mandatory for all teams planning to race in the 24 Hours of Daytona.

On December 17, 2020, IMSA announced an adjustment to the schedule due to the ongoing COVID-19 pandemic, shifting the "West Coast Swing" rounds at WeatherTech Raceway Laguna Seca and the Long Beach street circuit from April to September.

On March 4, 2021, IMSA announced a further change to the schedule, again because of the pandemic, because the 24 Heures du Mans was rescheduled to August 21–22. The round at VIR, which clashed with the rescheduled Le Mans date, was moved from August 22 to October 9, while the season-ending Petit Le Mans shifted from October 9 to November 13.

In a related change on March 25, 2021, the Detroit round, initially scheduled for June 5 with the classes not at Le Mans attending, was moved back after the date shift for Le Mans, with the round shifted to June 12 and becoming a single meeting with INDYCAR. The LMP2 class was dropped from the event, with a replacement venue to be announced at a later date. The GTLM class was added, but will not score points towards the championship.

In a fourth pandemic-related change on April 7, 2021, IMSA announced the cancellation of the event at Canadian Tire Motorsport Park because of Canadian quarantine restrictions, replacing it with a standard-distance (three hour race, 2 hours, 40 minutes of racing format) at Watkins Glen International on Friday, July 2, dubbed the "WeatherTech 240 at The Glen." The race used the format intended for Mosport, with all classes competing; however the GTD class scored points only towards the WeatherTech Sprint Cup.

Race is part of the Michelin Endurance Cup
Race is part of the WeatherTech Sprint Cup

Rnd.	Race	Length	Classes	Circuit	Location	Date
QR	Motul Pole Award 100	1 hour, 40 minutes	All (Note: Race awarded qualifying points and set the starting lineup for the Rolex 24 at Daytona only.)	Daytona International Speedway	Daytona Beach, Florida	January 24
1	Rolex 24 at Daytona	24 hours	All (Note: The LMP2 and LMP3 class only scored points towards the Michelin Endurance Cup.)	Daytona International Speedway	Daytona Beach, Florida	January 30–31
2	Mobil 1 Twelve Hours of Sebring	12 hours	All	Sebring International Raceway	Sebring, Florida	March 20
3	Acura Sports Car Challenge	2 hours, 40 minutes	DPi, LMP3, GTD	Mid-Ohio Sports Car Course	Lexington, Ohio	May 16
4	Detroit Grand Prix	1 hour, 40 minutes	DPi, GTLM, (Note: Non-Points Event) GTD (Note: The GTD class only scored points towards the WeatherTech Sprint Cup.)	The Raceway on Belle Isle	Detroit, Michigan	June 12
5	Sahlen's Six Hours of The Glen	6 hours	All	Watkins Glen International	Watkins Glen, New York	June 27
6	WeatherTech 240 at the Glen	2 hours, 40 minutes	All	Watkins Glen International	Watkins Glen, New York	July 2
7	Northeast Grand Prix	2 hours, 40 minutes	GTLM, GTD	Lime Rock Park	Lakeville, Connecticut	July 17
8	IMSA Sports Car Weekend	2 hours, 40 minutes	All	Road America	Elkhart Lake, Wisconsin	August 8
9	Hyundai Monterey Sports Car Championship	2 hours, 40 minutes	DPi, LMP2, GTLM, GTD	WeatherTech Raceway Laguna Seca	Monterey, California	September 12
10	Acura Grand Prix of Long Beach	1 hour, 40 minutes	DPi, GTLM, GTD	Long Beach Street Circuit	Long Beach, California	September 25
11	Michelin GT Challenge at VIR	2 hours, 40 minutes	GTLM, GTD	Virginia International Raceway	Alton, Virginia	October 9
12	Motul Petit Le Mans	10 hours	All	Michelin Raceway Road Atlanta	Braselton, Georgia	November 13

== Entries ==
=== Daytona Prototype international (DPi) ===
Team	Chassis	Engine	No.	Drivers	Rounds
(United States) Cadillac Chip Ganassi Racing	Cadillac DPi-V.R	Cadillac LT4 5.5 L V8	01	(Netherlands) Renger van der Zande	All
(United States) Cadillac Chip Ganassi Racing	Cadillac DPi-V.R	Cadillac LT4 5.5 L V8	01	(Denmark) Kevin Magnussen	1–10
(United States) Cadillac Chip Ganassi Racing	Cadillac DPi-V.R	Cadillac LT4 5.5 L V8	01	(New Zealand) Scott Dixon	1–2, 12
(United States) Cadillac Chip Ganassi Racing	Cadillac DPi-V.R	Cadillac LT4 5.5 L V8	01	(New Zealand) Earl Bamber	12
(United States) JDC-Mustang Sampling Racing	Cadillac DPi-V.R	Cadillac LT4 5.5 L V8	5	(France) Loïc Duval	All
(United States) JDC-Mustang Sampling Racing	Cadillac DPi-V.R	Cadillac LT4 5.5 L V8	5	(France) Tristan Vautier	All
(United States) JDC-Mustang Sampling Racing	Cadillac DPi-V.R	Cadillac LT4 5.5 L V8	5	(France) Sébastien Bourdais	1–2, 5, 12
(United States) WTR-Konica Minolta Acura	Acura ARX-05	Acura AR35TT 3.5 L Turbo V6	10	(Portugal) Filipe Albuquerque	All
(United States) WTR-Konica Minolta Acura	Acura ARX-05	Acura AR35TT 3.5 L Turbo V6	10	(United States) Ricky Taylor	All
(United States) WTR-Konica Minolta Acura	Acura ARX-05	Acura AR35TT 3.5 L Turbo V6	10	(United States) Alexander Rossi	1–2, 5, 12
(United States) WTR-Konica Minolta Acura	Acura ARX-05	Acura AR35TT 3.5 L Turbo V6	10	(Brazil) Hélio Castroneves	1
(United States) Whelen Engineering Racing	Cadillac DPi-V.R	Cadillac LT4 5.5 L V8	31	(Brazil) Pipo Derani	All
(United States) Whelen Engineering Racing	Cadillac DPi-V.R	Cadillac LT4 5.5 L V8	31	(Brazil) Felipe Nasr	All
(United States) Whelen Engineering Racing	Cadillac DPi-V.R	Cadillac LT4 5.5 L V8	31	(United Kingdom) Mike Conway	1–2, 5, 12
(United States) Whelen Engineering Racing	Cadillac DPi-V.R	Cadillac LT4 5.5 L V8	31	(United States) Chase Elliott	1
(United States) Ally Cadillac Racing	Cadillac DPi-V.R	Cadillac LT4 5.5 L V8	48	(United States) Jimmie Johnson	1–2, 5, 12
(United States) Ally Cadillac Racing	Cadillac DPi-V.R	Cadillac LT4 5.5 L V8	48	(Japan) Kamui Kobayashi	1–2, 5, 12
(United States) Ally Cadillac Racing	Cadillac DPi-V.R	Cadillac LT4 5.5 L V8	48	(France) Simon Pagenaud	1–2, 5, 12
(United States) Ally Cadillac Racing	Cadillac DPi-V.R	Cadillac LT4 5.5 L V8	48	(Germany) Mike Rockenfeller	1
(Japan) Mazda Motorsports	Mazda RT24-P	Mazda MZ-2.0T 2.0 L Turbo I4	55	(United Kingdom) Oliver Jarvis	All
(Japan) Mazda Motorsports	Mazda RT24-P	Mazda MZ-2.0T 2.0 L Turbo I4	55	(United Kingdom) Harry Tincknell	All
(Japan) Mazda Motorsports	Mazda RT24-P	Mazda MZ-2.0T 2.0 L Turbo I4	55	(United States) Jonathan Bomarito	1–2, 5, 12
(United States) Meyer Shank Racing with Curb-Agajanian	Acura ARX-05	Acura AR35TT 3.5 L Turbo V6	60	(United States) Dane Cameron	All
(United States) Meyer Shank Racing with Curb-Agajanian	Acura ARX-05	Acura AR35TT 3.5 L Turbo V6	60	(France) Olivier Pla	1–6, 8–10
(United States) Meyer Shank Racing with Curb-Agajanian	Acura ARX-05	Acura AR35TT 3.5 L Turbo V6	60	(Colombia) Juan Pablo Montoya	1–2, 12
(United States) Meyer Shank Racing with Curb-Agajanian	Acura ARX-05	Acura AR35TT 3.5 L Turbo V6	60	(United States) A. J. Allmendinger	1
(United States) Meyer Shank Racing with Curb-Agajanian	Acura ARX-05	Acura AR35TT 3.5 L Turbo V6	60	(Brazil) Hélio Castroneves	12

=== Le Mans Prototype 2 (LMP2) ===
In accordance with the 2017 LMP2 regulations, all cars in the LMP2 class use the Gibson GK428 V8 engine.

Team	Chassis	No.	Drivers	Rounds
(United States) Tower Motorsport by Starworks	Oreca 07	8	(France) Gabriel Aubry	All
(United States) Tower Motorsport by Starworks	Oreca 07	8	(Canada) John Farano	All
(United States) Tower Motorsport by Starworks	Oreca 07	8	(France) Timothé Buret	1–2
(United States) Tower Motorsport by Starworks	Oreca 07	8	(France) Matthieu Vaxivière	1
(United States) Tower Motorsport by Starworks	Oreca 07	8	(United States) James French	5, 12
(United States) WIN Autosport	Oreca 07	11	(United States) Tristan Nunez	All
(United States) WIN Autosport	Oreca 07	11	(United States) Steven Thomas	All
(United States) WIN Autosport	Oreca 07	11	(United States) Thomas Merrill	1–2, 5, 12
(United States) WIN Autosport	Oreca 07	11	(United Kingdom) Matthew Bell	1
(United States) Era Motorsport	Oreca 07	18	(United Kingdom) Ryan Dalziel	1–2, 5, 8–9, 12
(United States) Era Motorsport	Oreca 07	18	(United States) Dwight Merriman	1–2, 5, 8–9, 12
(United States) Era Motorsport	Oreca 07	18	(United Kingdom) Kyle Tilley	1–2, 5, 12
(United States) Era Motorsport	Oreca 07	18	(France) Paul-Loup Chatin	1
(Denmark) High Class Racing	Oreca 07	20	(Denmark) Dennis Andersen	1
(Denmark) High Class Racing	Oreca 07	20	(Denmark) Anders Fjordbach	1
(Denmark) High Class Racing	Oreca 07	20	(Austria) Ferdinand Habsburg-Lothringen	1
(Denmark) High Class Racing	Oreca 07	20	(Poland) Robert Kubica	1
(United Kingdom) United Autosports	Oreca 07	22	(United Kingdom) Wayne Boyd	2, 5, 12
(United Kingdom) United Autosports	Oreca 07	22	(United States) James McGuire	2, 5, 12
(United Kingdom) United Autosports	Oreca 07	22	(United Kingdom) Guy Smith	2, 5, 12
(Netherlands) Racing Team Nederland	Oreca 07	29	(Netherlands) Frits van Eerd	1
(Netherlands) Racing Team Nederland	Oreca 07	29	(Netherlands) Giedo van der Garde	1
(Netherlands) Racing Team Nederland	Oreca 07	29	(France) Charles Milesi	1
(Netherlands) Racing Team Nederland	Oreca 07	29	(Netherlands) Job van Uitert	1
(Italy) Cetilar Racing	Dallara P217	47	(Italy) Andrea Belicchi	1
(Italy) Cetilar Racing	Dallara P217	47	(Italy) Antonio Fuoco	1
(Italy) Cetilar Racing	Dallara P217	47	(Italy) Roberto Lacorte	1
(Italy) Cetilar Racing	Dallara P217	47	(Italy) Giorgio Sernagiotto	1
(Philippines) RWR Eurasia	Ligier JS P217	51	(United States) Austin Dillon	1
(Philippines) RWR Eurasia	Ligier JS P217	51	(Germany) Sven Müller	1
(Philippines) RWR Eurasia	Ligier JS P217	51	(United States) Cody Ware	1
(Philippines) RWR Eurasia	Ligier JS P217	51	(Turkey) Salih Yoluç	1
(United States) PR1/Mathiasen Motorsports	Oreca 07	52	(Denmark) Mikkel Jensen	All
(United States) PR1/Mathiasen Motorsports	Oreca 07	52	(United States) Ben Keating	All
(United States) PR1/Mathiasen Motorsports	Oreca 07	52	(United States) Scott Huffaker	1–2, 5, 12
(United States) PR1/Mathiasen Motorsports	Oreca 07	52	(France) Nicolas Lapierre	1
(United States) DragonSpeed USA	Oreca 07	81	(Canada) Garett Grist	1
(United States) DragonSpeed USA	Oreca 07	81	(United Kingdom) Ben Hanley	1
(United States) DragonSpeed USA	Oreca 07	81	(United States) Rob Hodes	1
(United States) DragonSpeed USA	Oreca 07	81	(Netherlands) Rinus VeeKay	1
(United States) DragonSpeed USA	Oreca 07	82	(Canada) Devlin DeFrancesco	1
(United States) DragonSpeed USA	Oreca 07	82	(United States) Eric Lux	1
(United States) DragonSpeed USA	Oreca 07	82	(Germany) Christopher Mies	1
(United States) DragonSpeed USA	Oreca 07	82	(Germany) Fabian Schiller	1

=== Le Mans Prototype 3 (LMP3) ===
In accordance with the 2020 LMP3 regulations, all cars in the LMP3 class use the Nissan VK56DE 5.6L V8 engine.

Team	Chassis	No.	Drivers	Rounds
(United Kingdom) United Autosports	Ligier JS P320	2	(Germany) Niklas Krütten	5, 12
(United Kingdom) United Autosports	Ligier JS P320	2	(France) Edouard Cauhaupé	5
(United Kingdom) United Autosports	Ligier JS P320	2	(United States) Austin McCusker	5
(United Kingdom) United Autosports	Ligier JS P320	2	(United Kingdom) Andy Meyrick	12
(United Kingdom) United Autosports	Ligier JS P320	2	(United Kingdom) Tom Gamble	12
(Belgium) Mühlner Motorsports America	Duqueine M30 - D08	6	(Germany) Laurents Hörr	1
(Belgium) Mühlner Motorsports America	Duqueine M30 - D08	6	(United States) Kenton Koch	1
(Belgium) Mühlner Motorsports America	Duqueine M30 - D08	6	(Germany) Moritz Kranz	1
(Belgium) Mühlner Motorsports America	Duqueine M30 - D08	6	(United Kingdom) Stevan McAleer	1
(United States) Forty7 Motorsports	Duqueine M30 - D08	7	(United States) Mark Kvamme	1, 12
(United States) Forty7 Motorsports	Duqueine M30 - D08	7	(Colombia) Gabby Chaves	1
(United States) Forty7 Motorsports	Duqueine M30 - D08	7	(United States) Trenton Estep	1
(United States) Forty7 Motorsports	Duqueine M30 - D08	7	(United States) Ryan Norman	1
(United States) Forty7 Motorsports	Duqueine M30 - D08	7	(United States) Oliver Askew	2
(United States) Forty7 Motorsports	Duqueine M30 - D08	7	(United Kingdom) Stevan McAleer	2
(United States) Forty7 Motorsports	Duqueine M30 - D08	7	(United States) Austin McCusker	2
(United States) Forty7 Motorsports	Duqueine M30 - D08	7	(Peru) Rodrigo Pflucker	12
(United States) Forty7 Motorsports	Duqueine M30 - D08	7	(Canada) Stefan Rzadzinski	12
(United States) Jr III Motorsports	Ligier JS P320	30	(Norway) Theodor Olsen	8
(United States) Jr III Motorsports	Ligier JS P320	30	(United States) Mike Skeen	8
(United States) Jr III Motorsports	Ligier JS P320	30	(United States) Ari Balogh	12
(United States) Jr III Motorsports	Ligier JS P320	30	(Canada) Garett Grist	12
(United States) Jr III Motorsports	Ligier JS P320	30	(United States) Spencer Pigot	12
(United States) Sean Creech Motorsport	Ligier JS P320	33	(Portugal) João Barbosa	1–3
(United States) Sean Creech Motorsport	Ligier JS P320	33	(United States) Lance Willsey	1–3
(United States) Sean Creech Motorsport	Ligier JS P320	33	(France) Yann Clairay	1–2
(United States) Sean Creech Motorsport	Ligier JS P320	33	(United Kingdom) Wayne Boyd	1
(United States) Andretti Autosport	Ligier JS P320	36	(United States) Jarett Andretti	3, 5–6, 8, 12
(United States) Andretti Autosport	Ligier JS P320	36	(United States) Oliver Askew	3, 5–6, 8, 12
(United States) Andretti Autosport	Ligier JS P320	36	(United States) Marco Andretti	5
(United States) Andretti Autosport	Ligier JS P320	36	(Australia) Josh Burdon	12
(United States) Performance Tech Motorsports	Ligier JS P320	38	(Sweden) Rasmus Lindh	All
(United States) Performance Tech Motorsports	Ligier JS P320	38	(Guatemala) Mateo Llarena	1–2, 5–6
(United States) Performance Tech Motorsports	Ligier JS P320	38	(Canada) Cameron Cassels	1
(United States) Performance Tech Motorsports	Ligier JS P320	38	(United States) Ayrton Ori	1
(United States) Performance Tech Motorsports	Ligier JS P320	38	(United States) Dan Goldburg	2–3, 5, 8, 12
(United States) Performance Tech Motorsports	Ligier JS P320	38	(Denmark) Malthe Jakobsen	12
(United States) FastMD Racing	Duqueine M30 - D08	40	(United States) Todd Archer	12
(United States) FastMD Racing	Duqueine M30 - D08	40	(United States) Max Hanratty	12
(United States) FastMD Racing	Duqueine M30 - D08	40	(Canada) James Vance	12
(United States) CORE Autosport	Ligier JS P320	54	(United States) Jon Bennett	All
(United States) CORE Autosport	Ligier JS P320	54	(United States) Colin Braun	All
(United States) CORE Autosport	Ligier JS P320	54	(United States) George Kurtz	1–2, 5, 12
(United States) CORE Autosport	Ligier JS P320	54	(United States) Matt McMurry	1
(United States) Riley Motorsports	Ligier JS P320	74	(United States) Gar Robinson	All
(United States) Riley Motorsports	Ligier JS P320	74	(Australia) Scott Andrews	1–2, 5, 12
(United States) Riley Motorsports	Ligier JS P320	74	(United States) Spencer Pigot	1–2
(United States) Riley Motorsports	Ligier JS P320	74	(United States) Oliver Askew	1
(United States) Riley Motorsports	Ligier JS P320	74	(Brazil) Felipe Fraga	3, 5–6, 8, 12
(United States) Riley Motorsports	Ligier JS P320	91	(United States) Jim Cox	All
(United States) Riley Motorsports	Ligier JS P320	91	(United States) Dylan Murry	All
(United States) Riley Motorsports	Ligier JS P320	91	(Netherlands) Jeroen Bleekemolen	1–2, 5, 12
(United States) Riley Motorsports	Ligier JS P320	91	(United States) Austin McCusker	1
(United States) Wulver Motorsports	Ligier JS P320	61	(Estonia) Tõnis Kasemets	8
(United States) Wulver Motorsports	Ligier JS P320	61	(United States) Augie Pabst	8
(United States) WIN Autosport	Duqueine M30 - D08	83	(United Kingdom) Matthew Bell	2, 12
(United States) WIN Autosport	Duqueine M30 - D08	83	(Germany) Niklas Krütten	2
(United States) WIN Autosport	Duqueine M30 - D08	83	(Mexico) Rodrigo Sales	2
(United States) WIN Autosport	Duqueine M30 - D08	83	(United States) Naveen Rao	12
(United States) WIN Autosport	Duqueine M30 - D08	83	(United Kingdom) Josh Skelton	12
(United Kingdom) D3+ Transformers-Dawson Racing	Ligier JS P320	84	(United States) Dominic Cicero	5–6
(United Kingdom) D3+ Transformers-Dawson Racing	Ligier JS P320	84	(Norway) Theodor Olsen	5–6
(United Kingdom) D3+ Transformers-Dawson Racing	Ligier JS P320	84	(United Kingdom) Ben Devlin	5

=== GT Le Mans (GTLM) ===
Team	Chassis	Engine	No.	Drivers	Rounds
(United States) Corvette Racing	Chevrolet Corvette C8.R	Chevrolet LT6.R 5.5 L V8	3	(Spain) Antonio García	All
(United States) Corvette Racing	Chevrolet Corvette C8.R	Chevrolet LT6.R 5.5 L V8	3	(United States) Jordan Taylor	All
(United States) Corvette Racing	Chevrolet Corvette C8.R	Chevrolet LT6.R 5.5 L V8	3	(Netherlands) Nicky Catsburg	1–2, 12
(United States) Corvette Racing	Chevrolet Corvette C8.R	Chevrolet LT6.R 5.5 L V8	4	(United States) Tommy Milner	All
(United States) Corvette Racing	Chevrolet Corvette C8.R	Chevrolet LT6.R 5.5 L V8	4	(United Kingdom) Nick Tandy	All
(United States) Corvette Racing	Chevrolet Corvette C8.R	Chevrolet LT6.R 5.5 L V8	4	(United Kingdom) Alexander Sims	1–2, 12
(United States) BMW Team RLL	BMW M8 GTE	BMW S63 4.0 L Turbo V8	24	(United States) John Edwards	1–2, 5, 12
(United States) BMW Team RLL	BMW M8 GTE	BMW S63 4.0 L Turbo V8	24	(Brazil) Augusto Farfus	1–2, 5, 12
(United States) BMW Team RLL	BMW M8 GTE	BMW S63 4.0 L Turbo V8	24	(Finland) Jesse Krohn	1–2, 5, 12
(United States) BMW Team RLL	BMW M8 GTE	BMW S63 4.0 L Turbo V8	24	(Germany) Marco Wittmann	1
(United States) BMW Team RLL	BMW M8 GTE	BMW S63 4.0 L Turbo V8	25	(United States) Connor De Phillippi	1–2, 5, 12
(United States) BMW Team RLL	BMW M8 GTE	BMW S63 4.0 L Turbo V8	25	(Austria) Philipp Eng	1–2, 5, 12
(United States) BMW Team RLL	BMW M8 GTE	BMW S63 4.0 L Turbo V8	25	(Canada) Bruno Spengler	1–2, 5, 12
(United States) BMW Team RLL	BMW M8 GTE	BMW S63 4.0 L Turbo V8	25	(Germany) Timo Glock	1
(United States) Risi Competizione	Ferrari 488 GTE Evo	Ferrari F154CB 4.0 L Turbo V8	62	(United Kingdom) James Calado	1
(United States) Risi Competizione	Ferrari 488 GTE Evo	Ferrari F154CB 4.0 L Turbo V8	62	(France) Jules Gounon	1
(United States) Risi Competizione	Ferrari 488 GTE Evo	Ferrari F154CB 4.0 L Turbo V8	62	(Italy) Alessandro Pier Guidi	1
(United States) Risi Competizione	Ferrari 488 GTE Evo	Ferrari F154CB 4.0 L Turbo V8	62	(Italy) Davide Rigon	1
(United States) WeatherTech Racing	Porsche 911 RSR-19	Porsche M97/80 4.2 L Flat-6	79	(United States) Cooper MacNeil	All
(United States) WeatherTech Racing	Porsche 911 RSR-19	Porsche M97/80 4.2 L Flat-6	79	(France) Kévin Estre	1, 11
(United States) WeatherTech Racing	Porsche 911 RSR-19	Porsche M97/80 4.2 L Flat-6	79	(Italy) Gianmaria Bruni	1
(United States) WeatherTech Racing	Porsche 911 RSR-19	Porsche M97/80 4.2 L Flat-6	79	(Austria) Richard Lietz	1
(United States) WeatherTech Racing	Porsche 911 RSR-19	Porsche M97/80 4.2 L Flat-6	79	(Australia) Matt Campbell	2, 5–6, 8–9, 12
(United States) WeatherTech Racing	Porsche 911 RSR-19	Porsche M97/80 4.2 L Flat-6	79	(France) Mathieu Jaminet	2, 5, 7, 10, 12
(United States) WeatherTech Racing	Porsche 911 RSR-19	Porsche M97/80 4.2 L Flat-6	97	(France) Frédéric Makowiecki	12
(United States) WeatherTech Racing	Porsche 911 RSR-19	Porsche M97/80 4.2 L Flat-6	97	(France) Kévin Estre	12
(United States) WeatherTech Racing	Porsche 911 RSR-19	Porsche M97/80 4.2 L Flat-6	97	(Denmark) Michael Christensen	12

=== GT Daytona (GTD) ===
Team	Chassis	Engine	No.	Drivers	Rounds
(United States) Paul Miller Racing	Lamborghini Huracán GT3 Evo	Lamborghini DGF 5.2 L V10	1	(United States) Bryan Sellers	All
(United States) Paul Miller Racing	Lamborghini Huracán GT3 Evo	Lamborghini DGF 5.2 L V10	1	(United States) Madison Snow	All
(United States) Paul Miller Racing	Lamborghini Huracán GT3 Evo	Lamborghini DGF 5.2 L V10	1	(United States) Corey Lewis	1–2, 5, 12
(United States) Paul Miller Racing	Lamborghini Huracán GT3 Evo	Lamborghini DGF 5.2 L V10	1	(Italy) Andrea Caldarelli	1
(Canada) Pfaff Motorsports	Porsche 911 GT3 R	Porsche 4.0 L Flat-6	9	(Canada) Zacharie Robichon	1–3, 5, 7–12
(Canada) Pfaff Motorsports	Porsche 911 GT3 R	Porsche 4.0 L Flat-6	9	(Belgium) Laurens Vanthoor	1–3, 5, 7–12
(Canada) Pfaff Motorsports	Porsche 911 GT3 R	Porsche 4.0 L Flat-6	9	(Germany) Lars Kern	1–2, 5, 12
(Canada) Pfaff Motorsports	Porsche 911 GT3 R	Porsche 4.0 L Flat-6	9	(Australia) Matt Campbell	1
(United States) Vasser Sullivan	Lexus RC F GT3	Toyota 2UR-GSE 5.4 L V8	12	(United States) Frankie Montecalvo	All
(United States) Vasser Sullivan	Lexus RC F GT3	Toyota 2UR-GSE 5.4 L V8	12	(United States) Zach Veach	1–3, 5–12
(United States) Vasser Sullivan	Lexus RC F GT3	Toyota 2UR-GSE 5.4 L V8	12	(United States) Robert Megennis	1–2, 5, 12
(United States) Vasser Sullivan	Lexus RC F GT3	Toyota 2UR-GSE 5.4 L V8	12	(United States) Townsend Bell	1, 4
(United States) Vasser Sullivan	Lexus RC F GT3	Toyota 2UR-GSE 5.4 L V8	14	(United Kingdom) Jack Hawksworth	All
(United States) Vasser Sullivan	Lexus RC F GT3	Toyota 2UR-GSE 5.4 L V8	14	(United States) Aaron Telitz	All
(United States) Vasser Sullivan	Lexus RC F GT3	Toyota 2UR-GSE 5.4 L V8	14	(United States) Kyle Kirkwood	1–2, 5, 12
(United States) Vasser Sullivan	Lexus RC F GT3	Toyota 2UR-GSE 5.4 L V8	14	(United Kingdom) Oliver Gavin	1
(United States) Wright Motorsports	Porsche 911 GT3 R	Porsche 4.0 L Flat-6	16	(United States) Patrick Long	1–3, 5, 7–12
(United States) Wright Motorsports	Porsche 911 GT3 R	Porsche 4.0 L Flat-6	16	(United States) Trent Hindman	1–2, 5, 7–12
(United States) Wright Motorsports	Porsche 911 GT3 R	Porsche 4.0 L Flat-6	16	(Belgium) Jan Heylen	1–2, 5, 12
(United States) Wright Motorsports	Porsche 911 GT3 R	Porsche 4.0 L Flat-6	16	(Austria) Klaus Bachler	1
(United States) Wright Motorsports	Porsche 911 GT3 R	Porsche 4.0 L Flat-6	16	(United States) Ryan Hardwick	3
(Austria) GRT Grasser Racing Team	Lamborghini Huracán GT3 Evo	Lamborghini DGF 5.2 L V10	19	(Germany) Tim Zimmermann	1–2, 5
(Austria) GRT Grasser Racing Team	Lamborghini Huracán GT3 Evo	Lamborghini DGF 5.2 L V10	19	(France) Franck Perera	1–2, 5–8, 10–12
(Austria) GRT Grasser Racing Team	Lamborghini Huracán GT3 Evo	Lamborghini DGF 5.2 L V10	19	(Spain) Albert Costa	1
(Austria) GRT Grasser Racing Team	Lamborghini Huracán GT3 Evo	Lamborghini DGF 5.2 L V10	19	(Canada) Misha Goikhberg	1, 4–8, 10–12
(Austria) GRT Grasser Racing Team	Lamborghini Huracán GT3 Evo	Lamborghini DGF 5.2 L V10	19	(South Africa) Stephen Simpson	2
(Austria) GRT Grasser Racing Team	Lamborghini Huracán GT3 Evo	Lamborghini DGF 5.2 L V10	19	(Italy) Marco Mapelli	4
(Austria) GRT Grasser Racing Team	Lamborghini Huracán GT3 Evo	Lamborghini DGF 5.2 L V10	19	(Italy) Michele Beretta	12
(Austria) GRT Grasser Racing Team	Lamborghini Huracán GT3 Evo	Lamborghini DGF 5.2 L V10	111	(Italy) Mirko Bortolotti	1
(Austria) GRT Grasser Racing Team	Lamborghini Huracán GT3 Evo	Lamborghini DGF 5.2 L V10	111	(Switzerland) Rolf Ineichen	1
(Austria) GRT Grasser Racing Team	Lamborghini Huracán GT3 Evo	Lamborghini DGF 5.2 L V10	111	(Italy) Marco Mapelli	1
(Austria) GRT Grasser Racing Team	Lamborghini Huracán GT3 Evo	Lamborghini DGF 5.2 L V10	111	(Netherlands) Steijn Schothorst	1
(Italy) AF Corse	Ferrari 488 GT3 Evo 2020	Ferrari F154CB 3.9 L Turbo V8	21	(Italy) Matteo Cressoni	1
(Italy) AF Corse	Ferrari 488 GT3 Evo 2020	Ferrari F154CB 3.9 L Turbo V8	21	(Italy) Simon Mann	1
(Italy) AF Corse	Ferrari 488 GT3 Evo 2020	Ferrari F154CB 3.9 L Turbo V8	21	(Denmark) Nicklas Nielsen	1
(Italy) AF Corse	Ferrari 488 GT3 Evo 2020	Ferrari F154CB 3.9 L Turbo V8	21	(Brazil) Daniel Serra	1
(United States) Heart of Racing Team	Aston Martin Vantage AMR GT3	Aston Martin M177 4.0 L Turbo V8	23	(Canada) Roman De Angelis	All
(United States) Heart of Racing Team	Aston Martin Vantage AMR GT3	Aston Martin M177 4.0 L Turbo V8	23	(United Kingdom) Ross Gunn	All
(United States) Heart of Racing Team	Aston Martin Vantage AMR GT3	Aston Martin M177 4.0 L Turbo V8	23	(United Kingdom) Ian James	1–2, 5, 12
(United States) Heart of Racing Team	Aston Martin Vantage AMR GT3	Aston Martin M177 4.0 L Turbo V8	23	(United Kingdom) Darren Turner	1
(United States) Heart of Racing Team	Aston Martin Vantage AMR GT3	Aston Martin M177 4.0 L Turbo V8	27	(United Kingdom) Ian James	9–11
(United States) Heart of Racing Team	Aston Martin Vantage AMR GT3	Aston Martin M177 4.0 L Turbo V8	27	(Spain) Alex Riberas	9–11
(United States) O'Gara Motorsport - USRT	Mercedes-AMG GT3 Evo	Mercedes-AMG M159 6.2 L V8	26	(United States) Steven Aghakhani	10
(United States) O'Gara Motorsport - USRT	Mercedes-AMG GT3 Evo	Mercedes-AMG M159 6.2 L V8	26	(Australia) Jake Eidson	10
(United States) Alegra Motorsports	Mercedes-AMG GT3 Evo	Mercedes-AMG M159 6.2 L V8	28	(Canada) Daniel Morad	1–6, 11–12
(United States) Alegra Motorsports	Mercedes-AMG GT3 Evo	Mercedes-AMG M159 6.2 L V8	28	(United States) Billy Johnson	1–2, 5
(United States) Alegra Motorsports	Mercedes-AMG GT3 Evo	Mercedes-AMG M159 6.2 L V8	28	(Germany) Maximilian Buhk	1
(United States) Alegra Motorsports	Mercedes-AMG GT3 Evo	Mercedes-AMG M159 6.2 L V8	28	(United States) Mike Skeen	1
(United States) Alegra Motorsports	Mercedes-AMG GT3 Evo	Mercedes-AMG M159 6.2 L V8	28	(United States) Michael de Quesada	2–6, 11–12
(United States) Alegra Motorsports	Mercedes-AMG GT3 Evo	Mercedes-AMG M159 6.2 L V8	28	(Spain) Daniel Juncadella	12
(United States) Gilbert Korthoff Motorsports	Mercedes-AMG GT3 Evo	Mercedes-AMG M159 6.2 L V8	32	(United States) Guy Cosmo	6, 8, 11–12
(United States) Gilbert Korthoff Motorsports	Mercedes-AMG GT3 Evo	Mercedes-AMG M159 6.2 L V8	32	(United States) Shane Lewis	6, 8
(United States) Gilbert Korthoff Motorsports	Mercedes-AMG GT3 Evo	Mercedes-AMG M159 6.2 L V8	32	(United States) Mike Skeen	11–12
(United States) Gilbert Korthoff Motorsports	Mercedes-AMG GT3 Evo	Mercedes-AMG M159 6.2 L V8	32	(United Kingdom) Stevan McAleer	12
(United States) GMG Racing	Porsche 911 GT3 R	Porsche 4.0 L Flat-6	34	(United States) James Sofronas	10
(United States) GMG Racing	Porsche 911 GT3 R	Porsche 4.0 L Flat-6	34	(United States) Kyle Washington	10
(United States) CarBahn Motorsports with Peregrine Racing	Audi R8 LMS Evo	Audi DAR 5.2 L V10	39	(United States) Richard Heistand	3–11
(United States) CarBahn Motorsports with Peregrine Racing	Audi R8 LMS Evo	Audi DAR 5.2 L V10	39	(United States) Jeff Westphal	3–11
(United States) CarBahn Motorsports with Peregrine Racing	Audi R8 LMS Evo	Audi DAR 5.2 L V10	39	(United States) Tyler McQuarrie	5
(United States) NTE Sport	Audi R8 LMS Evo	Audi DAR 5.2 L V10	42	(United States) Don Yount	1, 5, 8, 12
(United States) NTE Sport	Audi R8 LMS Evo	Audi DAR 5.2 L V10	42	(United States) Andrew Davis	1
(United States) NTE Sport	Audi R8 LMS Evo	Audi DAR 5.2 L V10	42	(United States) J. R. Hildebrand	1, 8
(United States) NTE Sport	Audi R8 LMS Evo	Audi DAR 5.2 L V10	42	(United States) Alan Metni	1
(United States) NTE Sport	Audi R8 LMS Evo	Audi DAR 5.2 L V10	42	(United States) Jaden Conwright	5, 12
(United States) NTE Sport	Audi R8 LMS Evo	Audi DAR 5.2 L V10	42	(Finland) Markus Palttala	5
(United States) NTE Sport	Audi R8 LMS Evo	Audi DAR 5.2 L V10	42	(Chile) Benjamín Hites	12
(United States) Magnus Racing with Archangel Motorsports	Acura NSX GT3 Evo	Acura JNC1 3.5 L Turbo V6	44	(United States) Andy Lally	1–3, 5, 7–12
(United States) Magnus Racing with Archangel Motorsports	Acura NSX GT3 Evo	Acura JNC1 3.5 L Turbo V6	44	(United States) John Potter	1–3, 5, 7–12
(United States) Magnus Racing with Archangel Motorsports	Acura NSX GT3 Evo	Acura JNC1 3.5 L Turbo V6	44	(United States) Spencer Pumpelly	1–2, 5, 12
(United States) Magnus Racing with Archangel Motorsports	Acura NSX GT3 Evo	Acura JNC1 3.5 L Turbo V6	44	(Germany) Mario Farnbacher	1
(United States) HTP Winward Motorsport	Mercedes-AMG GT3 Evo	Mercedes-AMG M159 6.2 L V8	57	(United Kingdom) Philip Ellis	1, 12
(United States) HTP Winward Motorsport	Mercedes-AMG GT3 Evo	Mercedes-AMG M159 6.2 L V8	57	(Germany) Maro Engel	1, 12
(United States) HTP Winward Motorsport	Mercedes-AMG GT3 Evo	Mercedes-AMG M159 6.2 L V8	57	(United States) Russell Ward	1, 12
(United States) HTP Winward Motorsport	Mercedes-AMG GT3 Evo	Mercedes-AMG M159 6.2 L V8	57	(Netherlands) Indy Dontje	1
(United States) Scuderia Corsa	Ferrari 488 GT3 Evo 2020	Ferrari F154CB 3.9 L Turbo V8	63	(Australia) Ryan Briscoe	1
(United States) Scuderia Corsa	Ferrari 488 GT3 Evo 2020	Ferrari F154CB 3.9 L Turbo V8	63	(United States) Bret Curtis	1
(United States) Scuderia Corsa	Ferrari 488 GT3 Evo 2020	Ferrari F154CB 3.9 L Turbo V8	63	(Brazil) Marcos Gomes	1
(United States) Scuderia Corsa	Ferrari 488 GT3 Evo 2020	Ferrari F154CB 3.9 L Turbo V8	63	(United Arab Emirates) Ed Jones	1
(United States) Scuderia Corsa	Ferrari 488 GT3 Evo 2020	Ferrari F154CB 3.9 L Turbo V8	63	(United States) Colin Braun	10
(United States) Scuderia Corsa	Ferrari 488 GT3 Evo 2020	Ferrari F154CB 3.9 L Turbo V8	63	(Italy) Daniel Mancinelli	10
(United States) Team TGM	Porsche 911 GT3 R	Porsche 4.0 L Flat-6	64	(United States) Ted Giovanis	1
(United States) Team TGM	Porsche 911 GT3 R	Porsche 4.0 L Flat-6	64	(United States) Hugh Plumb	1
(United States) Team TGM	Porsche 911 GT3 R	Porsche 4.0 L Flat-6	64	(United States) Matt Plumb	1
(United States) Team TGM	Porsche 911 GT3 R	Porsche 4.0 L Flat-6	64	(United States) Owen Trinkler	1
(United States) Gradient Racing	Acura NSX GT3 Evo	Acura JNC1 3.5 L Turbo V6	66	(United Kingdom) Till Bechtolsheimer	3–4, 6–11
(United States) Gradient Racing	Acura NSX GT3 Evo	Acura JNC1 3.5 L Turbo V6	66	(United States) Marc Miller	3–4, 6–10
(United States) Gradient Racing	Acura NSX GT3 Evo	Acura JNC1 3.5 L Turbo V6	66	(Germany) Mario Farnbacher	11
(United Kingdom) Inception Racing with Optimum Motorsport	McLaren 720S GT3	McLaren M840T 4.0 L Turbo V8	70	(United Kingdom) Ben Barnicoat	12
(United Kingdom) Inception Racing with Optimum Motorsport	McLaren 720S GT3	McLaren M840T 4.0 L Turbo V8	70	(United States) Brendan Iribe	12
(United Kingdom) Inception Racing with Optimum Motorsport	McLaren 720S GT3	McLaren M840T 4.0 L Turbo V8	70	(Denmark) Frederik Schandorff	12
(Australia) SunEnergy1 Racing	Mercedes-AMG GT3 Evo	Mercedes-AMG M159 6.2 L V8	75	(Canada) Mikaël Grenier	1–2, 4–5
(Australia) SunEnergy1 Racing	Mercedes-AMG GT3 Evo	Mercedes-AMG M159 6.2 L V8	75	(Australia) Kenny Habul	1–2, 4–5
(Australia) SunEnergy1 Racing	Mercedes-AMG GT3 Evo	Mercedes-AMG M159 6.2 L V8	75	(Italy) Raffaele Marciello	1
(Australia) SunEnergy1 Racing	Mercedes-AMG GT3 Evo	Mercedes-AMG M159 6.2 L V8	75	(Germany) Luca Stolz	1
(Australia) SunEnergy1 Racing	Mercedes-AMG GT3 Evo	Mercedes-AMG M159 6.2 L V8	75	(Germany) Maro Engel	2, 5
(Canada) Richard Mille - Compass Racing	Acura NSX GT3 Evo	Acura JNC1 3.5 L Turbo V6	76	(Germany) Mario Farnbacher	3–4, 6–10
(Canada) Richard Mille - Compass Racing	Acura NSX GT3 Evo	Acura JNC1 3.5 L Turbo V6	76	(Canada) Jeff Kingsley	3–4, 6–8
(Canada) Richard Mille - Compass Racing	Acura NSX GT3 Evo	Acura JNC1 3.5 L Turbo V6	76	(United States) Jacob Abel	9
(Canada) Richard Mille - Compass Racing	Acura NSX GT3 Evo	Acura JNC1 3.5 L Turbo V6	76	(United States) Matt McMurry	10
(New Zealand) Team Hardpoint EBM	Porsche 911 GT3 R	Porsche 4.0 L Flat-6	88	(United Kingdom) Katherine Legge	All
(New Zealand) Team Hardpoint EBM	Porsche 911 GT3 R	Porsche 4.0 L Flat-6	88	(Denmark) Christina Nielsen	1–2
(New Zealand) Team Hardpoint EBM	Porsche 911 GT3 R	Porsche 4.0 L Flat-6	88	(New Zealand) Earl Bamber	1
(New Zealand) Team Hardpoint EBM	Porsche 911 GT3 R	Porsche 4.0 L Flat-6	88	(United States) Rob Ferriol	1, 3–12
(New Zealand) Team Hardpoint EBM	Porsche 911 GT3 R	Porsche 4.0 L Flat-6	88	(Brazil) Bia Figueiredo	2
(New Zealand) Team Hardpoint EBM	Porsche 911 GT3 R	Porsche 4.0 L Flat-6	88	(United States) Andrew Davis	5, 12
(New Zealand) Team Hardpoint EBM	Porsche 911 GT3 R	Porsche 4.0 L Flat-6	99	(New Zealand) Earl Bamber	2
(New Zealand) Team Hardpoint EBM	Porsche 911 GT3 R	Porsche 4.0 L Flat-6	99	(United States) Trenton Estep	2
(New Zealand) Team Hardpoint EBM	Porsche 911 GT3 R	Porsche 4.0 L Flat-6	99	(United States) Rob Ferriol	2
(United States) Turner Motorsport	BMW M6 GT3	BMW S63 4.4 L Turbo V8	96	(United States) Bill Auberlen	All
(United States) Turner Motorsport	BMW M6 GT3	BMW S63 4.4 L Turbo V8	96	(United States) Robby Foley	All
(United States) Turner Motorsport	BMW M6 GT3	BMW S63 4.4 L Turbo V8	96	(Australia) Aidan Read	1–2, 5, 12
(United States) Turner Motorsport	BMW M6 GT3	BMW S63 4.4 L Turbo V8	96	(United States) Colton Herta	1
(United Kingdom) TF Sport	Aston Martin Vantage AMR GT3	Aston Martin M177 4.0 L Turbo V8	97	(Republic of Ireland) Charlie Eastwood	1
(United Kingdom) TF Sport	Aston Martin Vantage AMR GT3	Aston Martin M177 4.0 L Turbo V8	97	(United States) Ben Keating	1
(United Kingdom) TF Sport	Aston Martin Vantage AMR GT3	Aston Martin M177 4.0 L Turbo V8	97	(United States) Max Root	1
(United Kingdom) TF Sport	Aston Martin Vantage AMR GT3	Aston Martin M177 4.0 L Turbo V8	97	(United Kingdom) Richard Westbrook	1

== Race results ==
Bold indicates overall winner.

Rnd	Circuit	DPi Winning Team	LMP2 Winning Team	LMP3 Winning Team	GTLM Winning Team	GTD Winning Team	Report
Rnd	Circuit	DPi Winning Drivers	LMP2 Winning Drivers	LMP3 Winning Drivers	GTLM Winning Drivers	GTD Winning Drivers	Report
QR	Daytona	**(United States) #31 Whelen Engineering Racing**	(United States) #52 PR1/Mathiasen Motorsports	(Belgium) #6 Mühlner Motorsports America	(United States) #4 Corvette Racing	(United States) #96 Turner Motorsport	Report
QR	Daytona	**(Brazil) Pipo Derani** **(Brazil) Felipe Nasr**	(Denmark) Mikkel Jensen (United States) Ben Keating	(Germany) Laurents Hörr (Germany) Moritz Kranz	(United Kingdom) Alexander Sims (United Kingdom) Nick Tandy	(United States) Bill Auberlen (United States) Robby Foley	Report
1	Daytona	**(United States) #10 WTR-Konica Minolta Acura**	(United States) #18 Era Motorsport	(United States) #74 Riley Motorsports	(United States) #3 Corvette Racing	(United States) #57 HTP Winward Motorsport	Report
1	Daytona	**(Portugal) Filipe Albuquerque** **(Brazil) Helio Castroneves** **(United States) Alexander Rossi** **(United States) Ricky Taylor**	(France) Paul-Loup Chatin (United Kingdom) Ryan Dalziel (United States) Dwight Merriman (United Kingdom) Kyle Tilley	(Australia) Scott Andrews (United States) Oliver Askew (United States) Spencer Pigot (United States) Gar Robinson	(Netherlands) Nicky Catsburg (Spain) Antonio García (United States) Jordan Taylor	(Netherlands) Indy Dontje (United Kingdom) Philip Ellis (Germany) Maro Engel (United States) Russell Ward	Report
2	Sebring	**(United States) #5 JDC-Mustang Sampling Racing**	(United States) #52 PR1/Mathiasen Motorsports	(United States) #54 CORE Autosport	(United States) #79 WeatherTech Racing	(Canada) #9 Pfaff Motorsports	Report
2	Sebring	**(France) Sébastien Bourdais** **(France) Loïc Duval** **(France) Tristan Vautier**	(United States) Scott Huffaker (Denmark) Mikkel Jensen (United States) Ben Keating	(United States) Jon Bennett (United States) Colin Braun (United States) George Kurtz	(Australia) Matt Campbell (France) Mathieu Jaminet (United States) Cooper MacNeil	(Germany) Lars Kern (Canada) Zacharie Robichon (Belgium) Laurens Vanthoor	Report
3	Mid-Ohio	**(United States) #10 WTR-Konica Minolta Acura**	did not participate	(United States) #74 Riley Motorsports	did not participate	(United States) #96 Turner Motorsport	Report
3	Mid-Ohio	**(Portugal) Filipe Albuquerque** **(United States) Ricky Taylor**	did not participate	(Brazil) Felipe Fraga (United States) Gar Robinson	did not participate	(United States) Bill Auberlen (United States) Robby Foley	Report
4	Belle Isle	**(United States) #01 Cadillac Chip Ganassi Racing**	did not participate	did not participate	(United States) #4 Corvette Racing	(United States) #23 Heart of Racing Team	Report
4	Belle Isle	**(Denmark) Kevin Magnussen** **(Netherlands) Renger van der Zande**	did not participate	did not participate	(United States) Tommy Milner (United Kingdom) Nick Tandy	(Canada) Roman De Angelis (United Kingdom) Ross Gunn	Report
5	Watkins Glen	**(Japan) #55 Mazda Motorsport**	(United States) #11 WIN Autosport	(United States) #74 Riley Motorsports	(United States) #3 Corvette Racing	(United States) #96 Turner Motorsport	Report
5	Watkins Glen	**(United States) Jonathan Bomarito** **(United Kingdom) Oliver Jarvis** **(United Kingdom) Harry Tincknell**	(United States) Thomas Merrill (United States) Tristan Nunez (United States) Steven Thomas	(Australia) Scott Andrews (Brazil) Felipe Fraga (United States) Gar Robinson	(Spain) Antonio García (United States) Jordan Taylor	(United States) Bill Auberlen (United States) Robby Foley (Australia) Aidan Read	Report
6	Watkins Glen	**(United States) #31 Whelen Engineering Racing**	(United States) #52 PR1/Mathiasen Motorsports	(United States) #74 Riley Motorsports	(United States) #3 Corvette Racing	(United States) #14 Vasser Sullivan	Report
6	Watkins Glen	**(Brazil) Pipo Derani** **(Brazil) Felipe Nasr**	(Denmark) Mikkel Jensen (United States) Ben Keating	(Brazil) Felipe Fraga (United States) Gar Robinson	(Spain) Antonio García (United States) Jordan Taylor	(United Kingdom) Jack Hawksworth (United States) Aaron Telitz	Report
7	Lime Rock	did not participate	did not participate	did not participate	**(United States) #3 Corvette Racing**	(United States) #23 Heart of Racing Team	Report
7	Lime Rock	did not participate	did not participate	did not participate	**(Spain) Antonio García** **(United States) Jordan Taylor**	(Canada) Roman De Angelis (United Kingdom) Ross Gunn	Report
8	Road America	**(United States) #31 Whelen Engineering Racing**	(United States) #18 Era Motorsport	(United States) #54 CORE Autosport	(United States) #79 WeatherTech Racing	(Canada) #9 Pfaff Motorsports	Report
8	Road America	**(Brazil) Pipo Derani** **(Brazil) Felipe Nasr**	(United Kingdom) Ryan Dalziel (United States) Dwight Merriman	(United States) Jon Bennett (United States) Colin Braun	(Australia) Matt Campbell (United States) Cooper MacNeil	(Canada) Zacharie Robichon (Belgium) Laurens Vanthoor	Report
9	Laguna Seca	**(United States) #10 WTR-Konica Minolta Acura**	(United States) #52 PR1/Mathiasen Motorsports	did not participate	(United States) #4 Corvette Racing	(Canada) #9 Pfaff Motorsports	Report
9	Laguna Seca	**(Portugal) Filipe Albuquerque** **(United States) Ricky Taylor**	(Denmark) Mikkel Jensen (United States) Ben Keating	did not participate	(United States) Tommy Milner (United Kingdom) Nick Tandy	(Canada) Zacharie Robichon (Belgium) Laurens Vanthoor	Report
10	Long Beach	**(United States) #31 Whelen Engineering Racing**	did not participate	did not participate	(United States) #4 Corvette Racing	(United States) #1 Paul Miller Racing	Report
10	Long Beach	**(Brazil) Pipo Derani** **(Brazil) Felipe Nasr**	did not participate	did not participate	(United States) Tommy Milner (United Kingdom) Nick Tandy	(United States) Bryan Sellers (United States) Madison Snow	Report
11	VIR	did not participate	did not participate	did not participate	**(United States) #4 Corvette Racing**	(Canada) #9 Pfaff Motorsports	Report
11	VIR	did not participate	did not participate	did not participate	**(United States) Tommy Milner** **(United Kingdom) Nick Tandy**	(Canada) Zacharie Robichon (Belgium) Laurens Vanthoor	Report
12	Road Atlanta	**(Japan) #55 Mazda Motorsport**	(United States) #8 Tower Motorsport by Starworks	(United States) #74 Riley Motorsports	(United States) #79 WeatherTech Racing	(United States) #23 Heart of Racing Team	Report
12	Road Atlanta	**(United States) Jonathan Bomarito** **(United Kingdom) Oliver Jarvis** **(United Kingdom) Harry Tincknell**	(France) Gabriel Aubry (Canada) John Farano (United States) James French	(Australia) Scott Andrews (Brazil) Felipe Fraga (United States) Gar Robinson	(Australia) Matt Campbell (France) Mathieu Jaminet (United States) Cooper MacNeil	(Canada) Roman De Angelis (United Kingdom) Ross Gunn (United Kingdom) Ian James	Report

== Championship standings ==
=== Points systems ===
Championship points are awarded in each class at the finish of each event. Points are awarded based on finishing positions in qualifying and the race as shown in the chart below.

Position	1	2	3	4	5	6	7	8	9	10	11	12	13	14	15	16	17	18	19	20	21	22	23	24	25	26	27	28	29	30+
Qualifying	35	32	30	28	26	25	24	23	22	21	20	19	18	17	16	15	14	13	12	11	10	9	8	7	6	5	4	3	2	1
Race	350	320	300	280	260	250	240	230	220	210	200	190	180	170	160	150	140	130	120	110	100	90	80	70	60	50	40	30	20	10

Drivers points

Points are awarded in each class at the finish of each event.

Team points

Team points are calculated in exactly the same way as driver points, using the point distribution chart. Each car entered is considered its own "team" regardless if it is a single entry or part of a two-car team.

Manufacturer points

There are also a number of manufacturer championships which utilize the same season-long point distribution chart. The manufacturer championships recognized by IMSA are as follows:

Daytona Prototype international (DPi): Engine & bodywork manufacturer
GT Le Mans (GTLM): Car manufacturer
GT Daytona (GTD): Car manufacturer

Each manufacturer receives finishing points for its highest finishing car in each class. The positions of subsequent finishing cars from the same manufacturer are not taken into consideration, and all other manufacturers move up in the order.

Example: Manufacturer A finishes 1st and 2nd at an event, and Manufacturer B finishes 3rd. Manufacturer A receives 35 first-place points while Manufacturer B would earn 32 second-place points.

Michelin Endurance Cup

The points system for the Michelin Endurance Cup is different from the normal points system. Points are awarded on a 5–4–3–2 basis for drivers, teams and manufacturers. The first finishing position at each interval earns five points, four points for second position, three points for third, with two points awarded for fourth and each subsequent finishing position.

Position	1	2	3	Other Classified
Race	5	4	3	2

At Rolex 24 at Daytona, points are awarded at 6 hours, 12 hours, 18 hours and at the finish. At the Sebring 12 hours, points are awarded at 4 hours, 8 hours and at the finish. At the Watkins Glen 6 hours, points are awarded at 3 hours and at the finish. At the Petit Le Mans (10 hours), points are awarded at 4 hours, 8 hours and at the finish.

Like the season-long team championship, Michelin Endurance Cup team points are awarded for each car and drivers get points in any car that they drive, in which they are entered for points. The manufacturer points go to the highest placed car from that manufacturer (the others from that manufacturer not being counted), just like the season-long manufacturer championship.

For example: in any particular segment manufacturer A finishes 1st and 2nd and manufacturer B finishes 3rd. Manufacturer A only receives first-place points for that segment. Manufacturer B receives the second-place points.

=== Drivers' Championships ===
==== Standings: Daytona Prototype International (DPi) ====
Pos.	Drivers	DAY		SEB	MOH	BEL	WGL1	WGL2	ELK	LGA	LBH	ATL	Points	MEC
Pos.	Drivers	Q	R	SEB	MOH	BEL	WGL1	WGL2	ELK	LGA	LBH	ATL	Points	MEC
1	(Brazil) Pipo Derani (Brazil) Felipe Nasr	1	**6**	**6**	2	2	4	1	**1**	3	**1**	**2**	3407	32
2	(Portugal) Filipe Albuquerque (United States) Ricky Taylor	5	1	4	1	3	**3**	**3**	4	**1**	4	3	3396	45
3	(United Kingdom) Oliver Jarvis (United Kingdom) Harry Tincknell	**2**	3	2	**3**	4	1	5	2	5	5	1	3264	39
4	(Netherlands) Renger van der Zande	7	5	5	5	**1**	6	2	3	2	2	5	3163	30
5	(United States) Dane Cameron	4	4	3	6	6	2	6	5	4	6	6	2946	34
6	(France) Loïc Duval (France) Tristan Vautier	3	7	1	4	5	7	4	6	6	3	7	2933	32
7	(Denmark) Kevin Magnussen	7	5	5	5	**1**	6	2	3	2	**2**		2879	24
8	(France) Olivier Pla	4	4	3	6	6	2	6	5	4	6		2668	25
9	(United States) Jonathan Bomarito	**2**	3	2			1					1	1436	39
10	(United States) Alexander Rossi	5	1	4			**3**					3	1348	45
11	(United Kingdom) Mike Conway	1	**6**	**6**			4					**2**	1231	32
12	(United States) Jimmie Johnson (Japan) Kamui Kobayashi (France) Simon Pagenaud	6	2	7^{†}			5					4	1203	28
13	(France) Sébastien Bourdais	3	7	1			7					7	1180	32
14	(Colombia) Juan Pablo Montoya	4	4	3								6	912	26
15	(New Zealand) Scott Dixon	7	5	5								5	858	26
16	(Brazil) Hélio Castroneves	5	1									6	654	27
17	(Germany) Mike Rockenfeller	6	2										345	12
18	(United States) A. J. Allmendinger	4	4										308	8
19	(United States) Chase Elliott	1	**6**										285	9
20	(New Zealand) Earl Bamber											5	284	6
Pos.	Drivers	DAY		SEB	MOH	BEL	WGL1	WGL2	ELK	LGA	LBH	ATL	Points	MEC

†: Post-event penalty. Car moved to back of class.

Colour	Result
Gold	Winner
Silver	Second place
Bronze	Third place
Green	Points classification
Blue	Non-points classification
Blue	Non-classified finish (NC)
Purple	Retired, not classified (Ret)
Red	Did not qualify (DNQ)
Red	Did not pre-qualify (DNPQ)
Black	Disqualified (DSQ)
White	Did not start (DNS)
White	Withdrew (WD)
White	Race cancelled (C)
Blank	Did not practice (DNP)
Blank	Did not arrive (DNA)
Blank	Excluded (EX)

**Bold** - Pole position

Italics - Fastest lap

==== Standings: Le Mans Prototype 2 (LMP2) ====
Pos.	Drivers	DAY^{‡}		SEB	WGL1	WGL2	ELK	LGA	ATL	Points	MEC
Pos.	Drivers	Q	R	SEB	WGL1	WGL2	ELK	LGA	ATL	Points	MEC
1	(Denmark) Mikkel Jensen (United States) Ben Keating	**1**	**7**	1	2	**1**	**3**	**1**	**2**	2162	45
2	(United States) Tristan Nunez (United States) Steven Thomas	10	5	**4**	**1**	2	4	3	3	2026	37
3	(France) Gabriel Aubry (Canada) John Farano	3	2	3	4	3	2	2	1	2012	42
4	(United Kingdom) Ryan Dalziel (United States) Dwight Merriman	7	1	2	5		1	4	5	1620	34
5	(United States) Scott Huffaker	**1**	**7**	1	2				**2**	1057	45
6	(United States) Thomas Merrill	10	5	**4**	**1**				3	1032	37
7	(United Kingdom) Kyle Tilley	7	1	2	5				5	930	34
8	(United Kingdom) Wayne Boyd (United States) James McGuire (United Kingdom) Guy Smith			5^{†}	3				4	920	18
9	(United States) James French				4				1	686	16
10	(France) Timothé Buret	3	2	3						326	26
-	(France) Paul-Loup Chatin	7	1							0	13
-	(France) Matthieu Vaxivière	3	2							0	16
-	(Canada) Devlin DeFrancesco (United States) Eric Lux (Germany) Christopher Mies (Germany) Fabian Schiller	9	3							0	13
-	(United States) Austin Dillon (Germany) Sven Müller (United States) Cody Ware (Turkey) Salih Yoluç	8	4							0	8
-	(United Kingdom) Matthew Bell	10	5							0	11
-	(Italy) Andrea Belicchi (Italy) Antonio Fuoco (Italy) Roberto Lacorte (Italy) Giorgio Sernagiotto	6	6							0	11
-	(France) Nicolas Lapierre	**1**	**7**							0	8
-	(Netherlands) Frits van Eerd (Netherlands) Giedo van der Garde (France) Charles Milesi (Netherlands) Job van Uitert	4	8							0	8
-	(Denmark) Dennis Andersen (Denmark) Anders Fjordbach (Austria) Ferdinand Habsburg-Lothringen (Poland) Robert Kubica	2	9							0	8
-	(Canada) Garett Grist (United Kingdom) Ben Hanley (United States) Rob Hodes (Netherlands) Rinus VeeKay	5	10							0	8
Pos.	Drivers	DAY^{‡}		SEB	WGL1	WGL2	ELK	LGA	ATL	Points	MEC

†: Post-event penalty. Car moved to back of class.

‡: Points count towards Michelin Endurance Cup championship only

==== Standings: Le Mans Prototype 3 (LMP3) ====
Pos.	Drivers	DAY^{‡}		SEB	MOH	WGL1	WGL2	ELK	ATL	Points	MEC
Pos.	Drivers	Q	R	SEB	MOH	WGL1	WGL2	ELK	ATL	Points	MEC
1	(United States) Gar Robinson	DNS	1	3	**1**	1	1	3	1	2176	55
2	(United States) Jon Bennett (United States) Colin Braun	3	5	1	4	2	3	1	7	1990	31
3	(United States) Jim Cox (United States) Dylan Murry	6	4	2	3	3	2	4	3	1922	33
4	(Brazil) Felipe Fraga				**1**	1	1	3	1	1846	24
5	(Sweden) Rasmus Lindh	5	6	**7**	2	7	5	**2**	9	1790	27
6	(United States) Oliver Askew	DNS	1	4	6	4	4	5	10	1744	39
7	(United States) Dan Goldburg			**7**	2	7		**2**	9	1495	19
8	(United States) Jarett Andretti				6	4	4	5	10	1432	10
9	(Australia) Scott Andrews	DNS	1	3		1			1	1081	55
10	(Netherlands) Jeroen Bleekemolen	6	4	2		3			3	998	33
11	(United States) George Kurtz	3	5	1		2			7	968	31
12	(Germany) Niklas Krütten			6		5			**6**	854	16
13	(Guatemala) Mateo Llarena	5	6	**7**		7	**5**			838	21
14	(United States) Spencer Pigot	DNS	1	3					2	673	44
15	(United States) Austin McCusker	6	4	4		**5**				607	21
16	(Portugal) João Barbosa (United States) Lance Willsey	4	2	5	5					571	21
17	(United States) Dom Cicero (Norway) Theodor Olsen					6	6			526	4
18	(United Kingdom) Matthew Bell			6					8	504	12
19	(United States) Ari Balogh (Canada) Garett Grist								2	343	13
20	(United Kingdom) Stevan McAleer	**1**	**3**	4						312	22
21	(United States) Marco Andretti					4				312	4
22	(United States) Todd Archer (United States) Max Hanratty (Canada) James Vance								4	304	6
23	(France) Edouard Cauhaupé					5				295	4
24	(France) Yann Clairay	4	2	5						285	21
25	(United States) Mark Kvamme	2	7						5	285	14
26	(Peru) Rodrigo Pflucker (Canada) Stefan Rzadzinski								5	285	6
27	(United Kingdom) Tom Gamble (United Kingdom) Andy Meyrick								6	285	6
28	(United Kingdom) Ben Devlin					6				276	4
29	(Estonia) Tõnis Kasemets (United States) Augie Pabst							6		276	0
30	(Mexico) Rodrigo Sales			6						274	6
31	(United States) Terry Olson (United States) Mike Skeen							7		265	0
32	(Denmark) Malthe Jakobsen								9	252	6
33	(Australia) Josh Burdon								10	240	6
34	(United States) Naveen Rao (United Kingdom) Josh Skelton								8	230	6
-	(United Kingdom) Wayne Boyd	4	2							0	15
-	(Germany) Laurents Hörr (United States) Kenton Koch (Germany) Moritz Kranz	**1**	**3**							0	13
-	(United States) Matt McMurry	3	5							0	8
-	(Canada) Cameron Cassels (United States) Ayrton Ori	5	6							0	8
-	(Colombia) Gabby Chaves (United States) Trenton Estep (United States) Ryan Norman	2	7							0	8
Pos.	Drivers	DAY^{‡}		SEB	MOH	WGL1	WGL2	ELK	ATL	Points	MEC

‡: Points count towards Michelin Endurance Cup championship only

==== Standings: Grand Touring Le Mans (GTLM) ====
Pos.	Drivers	DAY		SEB	BEL^{‡}	WGL1	WGL2	LIM	ELK	LGA	LBH	VIR	ATL	Points	MEC
Pos.	Drivers	Q	R	SEB	BEL^{‡}	WGL1	WGL2	LIM	ELK	LGA	LBH	VIR	ATL	Points	MEC
1	(Spain) Antonio García (United States) Jordan Taylor	2	1	**4**	2	**1**	**1**	**1**	**2**	**2**	**2**	2	6	3549	40
2	(United States) Tommy Milner (United Kingdom) Nick Tandy	1	**2**	5	**1**	4	2	2	3	1	1	**1**	4	3448	44
3	(United States) Cooper MacNeil	3	6	1		5	3	3	1	3	3	3	1	3356	35
4	(Australia) Matt Campbell			1		5	3		1	3			1	2084	27
5	(France) Mathieu Jaminet			1		5		3			3		1	1706	27
6	(United States) John Edwards (Brazil) Augusto Farfus (Finland) Jesse Krohn	**6**	3	3		2							**3**	1336	35
7	(United States) Connor De Phillippi (Austria) Philipp Eng (Canada) Bruno Spengler	5	5	2		3							5	1251	35
8	(Netherlands) Nicky Catsburg	2	1	**4**									6	977	31
9	(France) Kévin Estre	3	6									3	2	958	17
10	(United Kingdom) Alexander Sims	1	**2**	5									4	953	37
11	(Denmark) Michael Christensen (France) Frédéric Makowiecki												2	348	9
12	(Germany) Marco Wittmann	**6**	3											325	11
13	(United Kingdom) James Calado (France) Jules Gounon (Italy) Alessandro Pier Guidi (Italy) Davide Rigon	4	4											308	8
14	(Germany) Timo Glock	5	5											286	9
15	(Italy) Gianmaria Bruni (Austria) Richard Lietz	3	6											280	8
Pos.	Drivers	DAY		SEB	BEL^{‡}	WGL1	WGL2	LIM	ELK	LGA	LBH	VIR	ATL	Points	MEC

‡: Non-points event

==== Standings: Grand Touring Daytona (GTD) ====
Pos.	Drivers	DAY		SEB	MOH	BEL^{‡}	WGL1	WGL2^{‡}	LIM	ELK	LGA	LBH	VIR	ATL	Points	WTSC	MEC
Pos.	Drivers	Q	R	SEB	MOH	BEL^{‡}	WGL1	WGL2^{‡}	LIM	ELK	LGA	LBH	VIR	ATL	Points	WTSC	MEC
1	(Canada) Zacharie Robichon (Belgium) Laurens Vanthoor	2	12	1	6		7		4	1	1	2	1	2	3284	2069	38
2	(United States) Madison Snow (United States) Bryan Sellers	17	3	11	3	6	2	**10**	2	7	2	**1**	2	**7**	3163	2520	33
3	(Canada) Roman De Angelis (United Kingdom) Ross Gunn	6	5	3	4	1	3	3	**1**	4	5	6	5	1	3111	2539	34
4	(United States) Patrick Long	8	4	**2**	12		8		8	3	3	3	4	5	2943	1750	40
5	(United States) Bill Auberlen (United States) Robby Foley	1	**6**	8	1	8	1	12	5	2	4	16	**12**	10	2880	2196	27
6	(United States) Trent Hindman	8	4	**2**			8		8	3	**3**	3	4	5	2718	1525	40
7	(United Kingdom) Jack Hawksworth (United States) Aaron Telitz	4	16	7	**13**	4	**6**	1	3	**5**	6	4	3	15	2640	2407	27
8	(United States) Frankie Montecalvo	9	13	6	2	5	11	2	10	6	10	13	13	3	2538	2130	25
8	(United States) Zach Veach	9	13	6	2		11	2	10	6	10	13	13	3	2538	1840	25
9	(United Kingdom) Katherine Legge	13	10	5	11	11	10	8	12	8	8	9	10	8	2400	1864	24
10	(United States) Rob Ferriol	13	10	10	11	11	10	8	12	8	8	9	10	8	2354	1864	24
11	(United States) Andy Lally (United States) John Potter	11	11	4	9		12		13	13	9	14	14	6	2228	1225	24
12	(United Kingdom) Ian James	6	5	3			3				12	12	6	1	1949	669	34
13	(United States) Richard Heistand (United States) Jeff Westphal				7	**12**	9	4	6	10	7	5	7		1817	2092	4
14	(France) Franck Perera	18^{†}	19	13			13	11	7	15		17	9	13	1608	1085	24
15	(Germany) Mario Farnbacher	11	11		5	9		9	9	12	13	11	15		1575	1858	8
16	(Canada) Daniel Morad	14	9	12	10	10	5	5					8	4	1515	1006	24
17	(Canada) Misha Goikhberg	18^{†}	19			2	13	11	7	15		17	9	13	1410	1426	18
18	(United Kingdom) Till Bechtolsheimer				8	3		6	11	9	11	8	15		1365	1956	-
19	(United States) Michael de Quesada			12	10	10	5	5					8	4	1278	1006	16
20	(Germany) Lars Kern	2	12	1			7							2	1215	-	38
21	(Belgium) Jan Heylen	8	4	**2**			8							5	1193	-	40
22	(United States) Marc Miller				8	3		6	11	9	11	8			1185	1776	-
23	(Australia) Aidan Read	1	**6**	8			1							10	1158	-	27
24	(United States) Corey Lewis	17	3	11			2							**7**	1148	-	33
25	(United States) Robert Megennis	9	13	6			11							3	1042	-	25
26	(Germany) Maro Engel	5	1	9			14							11	1035	-	32
27	(United States) Spencer Pumpelly	11	11	4			12							6	1003	-	24
28	(United States) Don Yount	16	15				4			11				9	938	219	18
29	(United States) Kyle Kirkwood	4	16	7			**6**							15	898	-	27
30	(Canada) Mikaël Grenier (Australia) Kenny Habul	10	2	9		10	14								778	265	21
31	(Canada) Jeff Kingsley				5	9		9	9	12					750	1253	-
32	(United States) Billy Johnson	14	9	12			5								733	-	18
33	(Spain) Alex Riberas										12	12	6		669	669	-
34	(United States) Andrew Davis	16	15				10							8	656	-	18
35	(United States) Mike Skeen	14	9										11	14	644	219	14
36	(United Kingdom) Philip Ellis (United States) Russell Ward	5	1											11	598	-	22
37	(United States) Guy Cosmo							7		14			11	14	593	665	6
38	(United States) Jaden Conwright						4							9	544	-	10
39	(Germany) Tim Zimmermann	18^{†}	19	13			13								534	-	18
40	(Denmark) Christina Nielsen	13	10	5											508	-	14
41	(New Zealand) Earl Bamber	13	10	10											462	-	14
42	(United States) J. R. Hildebrand	16	15							11					394	219	8
43	(Netherlands) Indy Dontje	5	1												376	-	16
44	(Italy) Raffaele Marciello (Germany) Luca Stolz	10	2												341	-	11
45	(Italy) Andrea Caldarelli	17	3												314	-	12
46	(Austria) Klaus Bachler	8	4												303	-	11
47	(Spain) Daniel Juncadella													4	300	-	6
48	(Finland) Markus Palttala						4								299	-	4
49	(United Kingdom) Darren Turner	6	5												285	-	9
50	(United States) Colton Herta	1	**6**												285	-	8
51	(Brazil) Bia Figueiredo			5											280	-	6
52	(Republic of Ireland) Charlie Eastwood (United States) Ben Keating (United States) Max Root (United Kingdom) Richard Westbrook	12	7												259	-	8
53	(United States) Steven Aghakhani (Australia) Jake Eidson											7			255	255	-
54	(United States) Tyler McQuarrie						9								248	-	4
55	(Italy) Matteo Cressoni (Italy) Simon Mann (Denmark) Nicklas Nielsen (Brazil) Daniel Serra	**15**	8												246	-	13
56	(Chile) Benjamín Hites													9	245	-	6
57	(Germany) Maximilian Buhk	14	9												237	-	8
58	(United States) Trenton Estep			10											234	-	6
59	(United States) Ryan Hardwick				12										225	225	-
60	(United States) Colin Braun (Italy) Daniel Mancinelli											10			224	224	-
61	(Australia) Matt Campbell	2	12												222	-	8
62	(United States) Matt McMurry											11			221	221	-
63	(United Kingdom) Ben Barnicoat (United States) Brendan Iribe (Denmark) Frederik Schandorff													12	209	-	6
64	(Italy) Michele Beretta													13	208	-	6
65	(United States) Jacob Abel										13				204	204	-
66	(United States) Townsend Bell	9	13			5									202	290	8
67	(South Africa) Stephen Simpson			13											198	-	6
68	(Australia) Ryan Briscoe (United States) Bret Curtis (Brazil) Marcos Gomes (United Arab Emirates) Ed Jones	7	14												194	-	8
69	(United Kingdom) Stevan McAleer													14	188	-	6
70	(United States) Shane Lewis							7		14					186	446	-
71	(United Kingdom) Oliver Gavin	4	16												178	-	8
72	(United States) James Sofronas (United States) Kyle Washington											15			176	176	-
73	(United States) Alan Metni	16	15												175	-	8
74	(Italy) Marco Mapelli	3	18			2									160	341	8
74	(Italy) Mirko Bortolotti (Switzerland) Rolf Ineichen (Netherlands) Steijn Schothorst	3	18												160	-	8
75	(United States) Ted Giovanis (United States) Hugh Plumb (United States) Matt Plumb (United States) Owen Trinkler	DNS	17												140	-	8
76	(Spain) Albert Costa	18^{†}	19												133	-	8
Pos.	Drivers	DAY		SEB	MOH	BEL^{‡}	WGL1	WGL2^{‡}	LIM	ELK	LGA	LBH	VIR	ATL	Points	WTSC	MEC

†: Post-event penalty. Car moved to back of class.

‡: Points count towards WeatherTech Sprint Cup championship only.

=== Team's Championships ===
==== Standings: Daytona Prototype International (DPi) ====
Pos.	Team	Car	DAY		SEB	MOH	BEL	WGL1	WGL2	ELK	LGA	LBH	ATL	Points	MEC
Pos.	Team	Car	Q	R	SEB	MOH	BEL	WGL1	WGL2	ELK	LGA	LBH	ATL	Points	MEC
1	#31 Whelen Engineering Racing	Cadillac DPi-V.R	1	**6**	**6**	2	2	4	1	**1**	3	**1**	**2**	3407	32
2	#10 WTR-Konica Minolta Acura	Acura ARX-05	5	1	4	1	3	**3**	**3**	4	**1**	4	3	3396	45
3	#55 Mazda Motorsports	Mazda RT24-P	**2**	3	2	**3**	4	1	5	2	5	5	1	3264	39
4	#01 Cadillac Chip Ganassi Racing	Cadillac DPi-V.R	7	5	5	5	**1**	6	2	3	2	2	5	3163	30
5	#60 Meyer Shank Racing w/ Curb-Agajanian	Acura ARX-05	4	4	3	6	6	2	6	5	4	6	6	2946	34
6	#5 JDC-Mustang Sampling Racing	Cadillac DPi-V.R	3	7	1	4	5	7	4	6	6	3	7	2933	32
7	#48 Ally Cadillac Racing	Cadillac DPi-V.R	6	2	7^{†}			5					4	1203	28
Pos.	Team	Car	DAY		SEB	MOH	BEL	WGL1	WGL2	ELK	LGA	LBH	ATL	Points	MEC

†: Post-event penalty. Car moved to back of class.

==== Standings: Le Mans Prototype 2 (LMP2) ====
Pos.	Team	Chassis	DAY^{‡}		SEB	WGL1	WGL2	ELK	LGA	ATL	Points	MEC
Pos.	Team	Chassis	Q	R	SEB	WGL1	WGL2	ELK	LGA	ATL	Points	MEC
1	#52 PR1 Mathiasen Motorsports	Oreca 07	**1**	**7**	1	2	**1**	**3**	**1**	**2**	2162	45
2	#11 WIN Autosport	Oreca 07	10	5	**4**	**1**	2	4	3	3	2026	37
3	#8 Tower Motorsport	Oreca 07	3	2	3	4	3	2	2	1	2012	42
4	#18 Era Motorsport	Oreca 07	7	1	2	5		1	4	5	1620	34
5	#22 United Autosports	Oreca 07			5^{†}	3				4	920	18
-	#82 DragonSpeed USA	Oreca 07	9	3							0	13
-	#51 RWR-Eurasia	Ligier JS P217	8	4							0	8
-	#47 Cetilar Racing	Dallara P217	6	6							0	11
-	#29 Racing Team Nederland	Oreca 07	4	8							0	8
-	#20 High Class Racing	Oreca 07	2	9							0	8
-	#81 DragonSpeed USA	Oreca 07	5	10							0	8
Pos.	Team	Chassis	DAY^{‡}		SEB	WGL1	WGL2	ELK	LGA	ATL	Points	MEC

†: Post-event penalty. Car moved to back of class.

‡: Points only awarded towards Michelin Endurance Cup championship

==== Standings: Le Mans Prototype 3 (LMP3) ====
Pos.	Team	Chassis	DAY^{‡}		SEB	MOH	WGL1	WGL2	ELK	ATL	Points	MEC
Pos.	Team	Chassis	Q	R	SEB	MOH	WGL1	WGL2	ELK	ATL	Points	MEC
1	#74 Riley Motorsports	Ligier JS P320	DNS	1	3	**1**	1	1	3	1	2176	55
2	#54 CORE Autosport	Ligier JS P320	3	5	1	4	2	3	1	7	1990	31
3	#91 Riley Motorsports	Ligier JS P320	6	4	2	3	3	2	4	3	1922	33
4	#38 Performance Tech Motorsports	Ligier JS P320	5	6	**7**	2	7	**5**	**2**	9	1790	27
5	#36 Andretti Autosport	Ligier JS P320				6	4	4	5	10	1432	10
6	#30 Jr III Racing	Ligier JS P320							7	2	608	13
7	#7 Forty7 Motorsports	Duqueine D-08	2	7	4					5	597	23
8	#2 United Autosports USA	Ligier JS P320					**5**			**6**	580	10
9	#33 Sean Creech Motorsport	Ligier JS P320	4	2	5	5					571	21
10	#84 Dawson Racing	Ligier JS P320					6	6			526	4
11	#83 WIN Autosport	Duqueine D-08			6					8	504	12
12	#40 FastMD Racing	Duqueine D-08								4	304	6
13	#61 Wulver Racing	Ligier JS P320							6		276	-
-	#6 Mühlner Motorsports America	Duqueine D-08	**1**	**3**							0	13
Pos.	Team	Chassis	DAY^{‡}		SEB	MOH	WGL1	WGL2	ELK	ATL	Points	MEC

‡: Points count towards Michelin Endurance Cup championship only

==== Standings: Grand Touring Le Mans (GTLM) ====
Pos.	Team	Car	DAY		SEB	BEL^{‡}	WGL1	WGL2	LIM	ELK	LGA	LBH	VIR	ATL	Points	MEC
Pos.	Team	Car	Q	R	SEB	BEL^{‡}	WGL1	WGL2	LIM	ELK	LGA	LBH	VIR	ATL	Points	MEC
1	#3 Corvette Racing	Chevrolet Corvette C8.R	2	1	**4**	2	**1**	**1**	**1**	**2**	**2**	**2**	2	6	3549	40
2	#4 Corvette Racing	Chevrolet Corvette C8.R	1	**2**	5	**1**	4	2	2	3	1	1	**1**	4	3448	44
3	#79 WeatherTech Racing	Porsche 911 RSR-19	3	6	1		5	3	3	1	3	3	3	1	3356	35
4	#24 BMW Team RLL	BMW M8 GTE	**6**	3	3		2							**3**	1336	35
5	#25 BMW Team RLL	BMW M8 GTE	5	5	2		3							5	1251	35
6	#97 WeatherTech Racing	Porsche 911 RSR-19												2	348	9
7	#62 Risi Competizione	Ferrari 488 GTE	4	4											308	8
Pos.	Team	Car	DAY		SEB	BEL^{‡}	WGL1	WGL2	LIM	ELK	LGA	LBH	VIR	ATL	Points	MEC

‡: Non-points event

==== Standings: Grand Touring Daytona (GTD) ====
Pos.	Team	Car	DAY		SEB	MOH	BEL^{‡}	WGL1	WGL2^{‡}	LIM	ELK	LGA	LBH	VIR	ATL	Points	WTSC	MEC
Pos.	Team	Car	Q	R	SEB	MOH	BEL^{‡}	WGL1	WGL2^{‡}	LIM	ELK	LGA	LBH	VIR	ATL	Points	WTSC	MEC
1	#9 Pfaff Motorsports	Porsche 911 GT3 R	2	12	1	6		7		4	1	1	2	1	2	3284	2069	38
2	#1 Paul Miller Racing	Lamborghini Huracán GT3 Evo	17	3	11	3	6	2	**10**	2	7	2	**1**	2	**7**	3163	2520	33
3	#23 Heart of Racing Team	Aston Martin Vantage AMR GT3	6	5	3	4	1	3	3	1	4	5	6	5	1	3111	2539	34
4	#16 Wright Motorsports	Porsche 911 GT3 R	8	4	**2**	12		8		8	3	**3**	3	4	5	2943	1750	40
5	#96 Turner Motorsport	BMW M6 GT3	1	**6**	8	1	8	1	12	5	2	4	16	**12**	10	2880	2196	27
6	#14 Vasser Sullivan	Lexus RC F GT3	4	16	7	**13**	4	**6**	1	3	**5**	6	4	3	15	2640	2407	27
7	#12 Vasser Sullivan	Lexus RC F GT3	9	13	6	2	5	11	2	10	6	10	13	13	3	2538	2130	25
8	#88 Team Hardpoint	Porsche 911 GT3 R	13	10	5	11	11	10	8	12	8	8	9	10	8	2400	1864	24
9	#44 Magnus Racing with Archangel Motorsports	Acura NSX GT3 Evo	11	11	4	9		12		13	13	9	14	14	6	2228	1225	24
10	#39 CarBahn Motorsports with Peregrine Racing	Audi R8 LMS Evo				7	12	9	4	6	10	7	5	7		1817	2092	4
11	#19 GRT Grasser Racing Team	Lamborghini Huracán GT3 Evo	18^{†}	19	13		2	13	11	7	15		17	9	13	1608	1426	24
12	#28 Alegra Motorsports	Mercedes-AMG GT3 Evo	14	9	12	10	10	5	5					8	4	1515	1006	24
13	#66 Gradient Racing	Acura NSX GT3 Evo				8	3		6	11	9	11	8	15		1365	1956	-
14	#76 Compass Racing	Acura NSX GT3 Evo				5	9		9	9	12	13	11			1175	1678	-
15	#42 NTE Sport	Audi R8 LMS Evo	16	15				4			11				9	938	219	18
16	#75 SunEnergy1 Racing	Mercedes-AMG GT3 Evo	10	2	9		7	14								778	265	21
17	#27 Heart of Racing Team	Aston Martin Vantage AMR GT3										12	12	6		669	669	-
18	#57 Winward Racing	Mercedes-AMG GT3 Evo	5	1											11	598	-	22
19	#32 Gilbert/Korthoff Motorsports	Mercedes-AMG GT3 Evo							7		14			11	14	593	665	6
20	#63 Scuderia Corsa	Ferrari 488 GT3	7	14									10			418	224	8
21	#97 TF Sport	Aston Martin Vantage AMR GT3	12	7												259	-	8
22	#26 O'Gara Motorsport / USRT	Mercedes-AMG GT3 Evo											7			255	255	-
23	#21 AF Corse	Ferrari 488 GT3	**15**	8												246	-	13
24	#99 Team Hardpoint EBM	Porsche 911 GT3 R			10											234	-	6
25	#70 Inception Racing with Optimum Motorsport	McLaren 720S GT3													12	209	-	6
26	#34 GMG Racing	Porsche 911 GT3 R											15			176	176	-
27	#111 GRT Grasser Racing Team	Lamborghini Huracán GT3 Evo	3	18												160	-	8
28	#64 Team TGM	Porsche 911 GT3 R	DNS	17												140	-	8
Pos.	Team	Car	DAY		SEB	MOH	BEL^{‡}	WGL1	WGL2^{‡}	LIM	ELK	LGA	LBH	VIR	ATL	Points	WTSC	MEC

†: Post-event penalty. Car moved to back of class.

‡: Points count towards WeatherTech Sprint Cup championship only.

=== Manufacturer's Championships ===
==== Standings: Daytona Prototype International (DPi) ====
Pos.	Manufacturer	DAY		SEB	MOH	BEL	WGL1	WGL2	ELK	LGA	LBH	ATL	Points	MEC
Pos.	Manufacturer	Q	R	SEB	MOH	BEL	WGL1	WGL2	ELK	LGA	LBH	ATL	Points	MEC
1	(United States) Cadillac	1	**2**	**1**	2	**1**	4	1	**1**	2	**1**	**2**	3666	48
2	(Japan) Acura	4	1	3	1	3	**2**	**3**	4	**1**	4	3	3553	51
3	(Japan) Mazda	**2**	3	2	**3**	4	1	5	2	5	5	1	3421	45
Pos.	Manufacturer	DAY		SEB	MOH	BEL	WGL1	WGL2	ELK	LGA	LBH	ATL	Points	MEC

==== Standings: Grand Touring Le Mans (GTLM) ====
Pos.	Manufacturer	DAY		SEB	BEL^{‡}	WGL1	WGL2	LIM	ELK	LGA	LBH	VIR	ATL	Points	MEC
Pos.	Manufacturer	Q	R	SEB	BEL^{‡}	WGL1	WGL2	LIM	ELK	LGA	LBH	VIR	ATL	Points	MEC
1	(United States) Chevrolet	1	**1**	**4**	**1**	**1**	**1**	**1**	**2**	**1**	**1**	**1**	4	3715	53
2	(Germany) Porsche	3	6	1		5	3	3	1	3	3	3	1	3546	38
3	(Germany) BMW	**5**	3	2		2							**3**	1407	49
4	(Italy) Ferrari	4	4											330	12
Pos.	Manufacturer	DAY		SEB	BEL^{‡}	WGL1	WGL2	LIM	ELK	LGA	LBH	VIR	ATL	Points	MEC

‡: Non-points event

==== Standings: Grand Touring Daytona (GTD) ====
Pos.	Manufacturer	DAY		SEB	MOH	BEL^{‡}	WGL1	WGL2^{‡}	LIM	ELK	LGA	LBH	VIR	ATL	Points	WTSC	MEC
Pos.	Manufacturer	Q	R	SEB	MOH	BEL^{‡}	WGL1	WGL2^{‡}	LIM	ELK	LGA	LBH	VIR	ATL	Points	WTSC	MEC
1	(Germany) Porsche	2	4	**1**	5	7	4	8	4	1	**1**	2	1	2	3425	2605	48
2	(Italy) Lamborghini	3	3	11	3	2	2	**10**	2	7	2	**1**	2	**7**	3290	2652	34
3	(United Kingdom) Aston Martin	6	5	3	4	1	3	3	**1**	4	5	6	5	1	3239	2642	38
4	(Japan) Lexus	4	13	6	2	4	**6**	1	3	**5**	6	4	3	3	3129	2636	29
5	(Germany) BMW	1	**6**	8	1	6	1	12	5	2	4	16	**12**	10	3089	2401	27
6	(Japan) Acura	11	11	4	5	3	12	6	9	9	9	8	14	6	2747	2245	26
7	(Germany) Audi	16	15		7	8	4	4	6	10	7	5	7	9	2487	2252	18
8	(Germany) Mercedes-AMG	5	1	9	8	5	5	5		14		7	8	4	2300	1649	33
9	(Italy) Ferrari	7	8									10			526	252	13
10	(United Kingdom) McLaren													12	243	-	6
Pos.	Manufacturer	DAY		SEB	MOH	BEL^{‡}	WGL1	WGL2^{‡}	LIM	ELK	LGA	LBH	VIR	ATL	Points	WTSC	MEC

‡: Points count towards WeatherTech Sprint Cup championship only.

=== Trueman/Akin Awards ===
The Trueman / Akin Driver Award programs recognize outstanding Drivers in the LMP2, and GTD classes who, while not professional Drivers, have established themselves and their driving credentials in the racing community through their talent, effort and determination. These awards are presented to those Drivers based on their individual performance, the performance of their Teams and their driving contribution to the Race result of their Car.

The Trueman / Akin programs are intended for Drivers that have built a career outside of racing and contribute a substantial portion of the funding to a Team's budget. These Drivers may become Race winners and champions but they are distinguished by the presence of a business career or other professional pursuit away from the racetrack.

Trueman points and the Jim Trueman season-end trophy are awarded to eligible LMP2 class Drivers. Akin points and the Bob Akin season-end trophy are awarded to eligible GTD class Drivers.

==== Standings: Jim Trueman Award ====
Pos.	Driver	DAY	SEB	WGL1	WGL2	ELK	LGA	ATL	Points
1	(United States) Ben Keating	7	1	2	1	3	1	2	2230
2	(Canada) John Farano	2	3	4	3	2	2	1	2190
3	(United States) Steven Thomas	5	4	1	2	4	3	3	2090
4	(United States) Dwight Merriman	1	2	5		1	4	5	1820
5	(United States) Thomas Merrill	5	4	1				3	1190
6	(United States) James McGuire		5	3				4	840
7	(United States) Eric Lux	3							300
8	(Turkey) Salih Yoluç	4							280
9	(Italy) Roberto Lacorte	6							250
10	(Netherlands) Frits van Eerd	8							230
11	(Denmark) Dennis Andersen	9							220
12	(United States) Rob Hodes	10							210
Pos.	Driver	DAY	SEB	WGL1	WGL2	ELK	LGA	ATL	Points

==== Standings: Bob Akin Award ====
Pos.	Driver	DAY	SEB	MOH	WGL1	LIM	ELK	LGA	LBH	VIR	ATL	Points
1	(United States) Rob Ferriol	10	10	11	10	12	8	8	9	10	8	3090
2	(United States) John Potter	11	4	9	12	13	13	9	14	14	6	2980
3	(United States) Richard Heistand			7	9	6	10	7	5	7		2370
4	(United Kingdom) Till Bechtolsheimer			8		11	9	11	8	15		1840
5	(United States) Don Yount	15			4		11				9	1180
6	(Australia) Kenny Habul	2	9		14							930
7	(United States) Ben Keating	7										320
8	(United States) Brendan Iribe										12	280
9	(United States) Ryan Hardwick			12								260
=	(United States) Bret Curtis	14										260
=	(United States) James Sofronas (United States) Kyle Washington								15			260
12	(United States) Shane Lewis						14					250
=	(United States) Alan Metni	15										250
14	(United States) Ted Giovanis (United States) Hugh Plumb	17										240
Pos.	Driver	DAY	SEB	MOH	WGL1	LIM	ELK	LGA	LBH	VIR	ATL	Points
