= 2025 Southeast Europe retail boycotts =

Anti-price increase consumer actions

2025 European retail boycotts
- Dates of the shopping boycotts by country Boycotts started on 24 January Boycotts started on 27 January Boycotts started on 30 January Boycotts started on 5 February Boycotts started on 10 February Boycotts started on 11 February Boycotts started on 13 February Boycotts started on 19 February Places where boycotts were planned
- Date: 24 January 2025 – March 2025
- Location: Central, Eastern and Southern Europe
- Caused by: Rising retail prices
- Methods: Boycotts

A series of boycotts were held against retail stores in Southeast and Eastern Europe in late January 2025. The boycotts started in Croatia on 24 January in reaction to rising retail prices across the country. Boycotts in Serbia, Montenegro, Bosnia and Herzegovina, North Macedonia, Slovenia, Albania, Romania, Bulgaria, Kosovo, Hungary, and Greece have been launched. Meanwhile, calls or plans for boycotts occurred in Slovakia and the Czech Republic.

Main chains were accused of engaging in price fixing. Apart from the potential violation of competition laws, the boycotts came amidst soaring food prices and cost of living throughout the region and are caused by various economic factors. The boycotts also received widespread public support.

== Background ==
Prices in Croatia had surged in the lead-up to the boycott, to the extent that salaries and pensions did not keep up. This began as part of the broader increase in prices due to inflation from the COVID-19 pandemic and was accentuated when Croatia joined the Eurozone in 2023. A declining agricultural sector, large food retailer monopolies and erosion of smaller businesses, an influx of imports, and an overreliance on tourism have all contributed to the inflationary surge. Further price hikes have since been implemented by various retailers in the country, leading to a 30% surge in prices according to official metrics.

Croatia became significantly more expensive to live in than neighboring countries. The price of basic food items, such as bread and eggs, increased by up to 60% in some cases. Attention was drawn to the cost of products in Croatia compared to their cost in neighboring countries; for example, a German shampoo brand was said to cost 130% more in Croatia than in Germany. In Bulgaria, it was 20% cheaper than in Croatia. This even included locally made products, with a Croatian seasoning costing €7.69 per kilogram within Croatia, as opposed to €6.35 in Sweden. Branimir Bradarić, writing for the Montenegrin newspaper Vijesti, noted that tourists in Croatia, who used to frequent restaurants on a regular basis, now began to eat in their apartments due to the exorbitant prices.

In Croatia, inflation went up for the fourth consecutive month. Services costs rose 6.3 percent and prices in the food, beverages and tobacco group were 4.7 percent higher than the previous year. As a result, Croats refrained from shopping at retail outlets and grocery stores, and avoided using delivery services, banks, restaurants, and cafes. The boycott also included the cessation of bill payments and shopping online.

== Croatian boycotts (24 January – present) ==
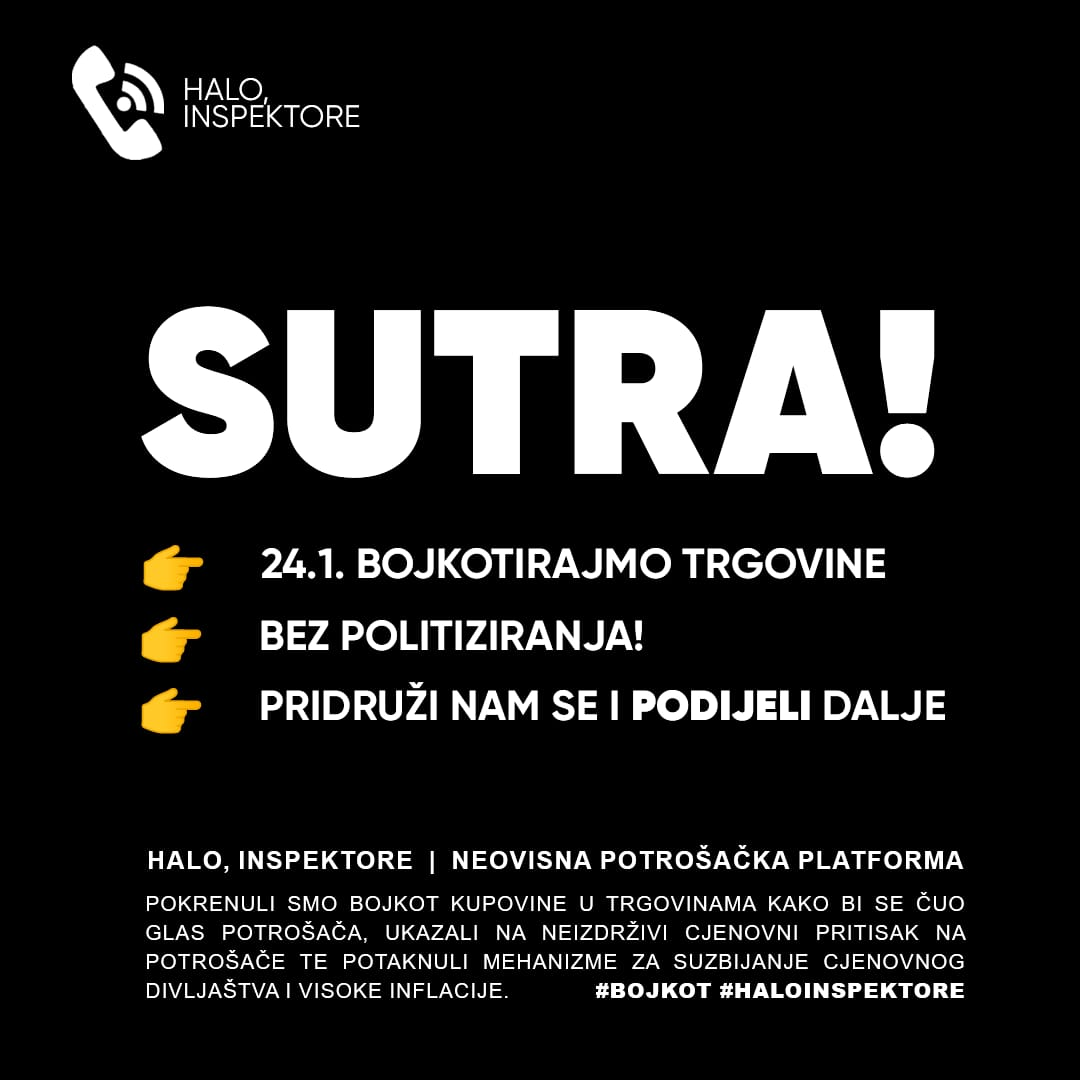
A social media flyer calling on consumers in Croatia to boycott produced by Halo, inspektore.

The idea for a boycott in Croatia began in the Facebook group Halo, inspektore, (Note: Croatian for Hello, Inspector) managed by the European Center for Consumer Excellence. (Note: Croatian: Europskog centra izvrsnosti potrošača, ECIP) Its president Josip Kelemen stated that the idea stemmed from the consumers themselves. Initially, it called for a boycott of veal for a week, citing an alleged 40% increase in food prices within the past few months. The idea for a one-day 24 January boycott spread across Croatian social media, receiving massive support. During the boycott in the latter half of January, there were multiple attempts to undermine it. One of the more prominent attempts was the renaming of groups made in support of the leading party's presidential candidate Dragan Primorac to "Halo inspektore".

=== First boycott ===
The boycott consisted of the avoidance of certain products such as bread, pasta, ham, sausage, fish, milk, dairy products, and some types of fruits and vegetables. The boycott was meant to send a strong message of dissatisfaction with the price increases. As a result, the Ministry of Economy of the Republic of Croatia expanded the list of products with restricted prices.

Data revealed that the total number of invoices issued in retail on Friday, 24 January, was 44% lower than it was on the Friday the week prior (17 January), while the total monetary cost was down by 53%. For all activities, it was 29% and 36% lower respectively. Empty shops and parking lots were reported.

=== Subsequent efforts ===
Although the boycott cut sales by half, retailers refused to lower their prices; this led to another week-long boycott starting on 30 January. This boycott specifically targeted the retail chains of Lidl, EuroSpin, and DM which were alleged to have exorbitant prices. Lidl was a focus of criticism because it entered the Croatian market under the promise of keeping them low. The boycott also targeted soda (specifically Coca-Cola), detergents, and bottled water. As part of the boycott, a general boycott of all products and services was called for on 31 January.

Halo, inspektore has announced the next phase of the boycott, beginning Friday, 7 February, which will target the supermarket chain Konzum for the entirety of the following week, in addition to a general market-wide boycott of all supermarkets scheduled on Friday. The target of the extended boycott was determined by an online poll, with Konzum receiving 31.7% of the vote. The third general boycott resulted in 20% lower total monetary cost and 15% lower number of invoices in retail than pre-boycott.

== Other boycotts and boycott plans ==
The success of the Croatian boycott spawned a domino effect, leading to other calls for boycotts throughout Southeast Europe, especially in the Yugosphere countries. A coalition led by Slovakia and other Eastern European countries was organized on 27 January. A synchronized strike across the former Yugoslav countries occurred on 31 January.

=== Albania ===
Calls for boycotts in Albania began to pick up in wake of the boycotts in other Balkan countries, with several separate initiatives springing up as a result. One called for a boycott from 5 to 10 February, while another called for a single-day 16 February boycott. An appeal distributed online claimed that "prices in Albania are among the most abusive in the European Union" (although the country is not in the union) and urged Albanians to target supermarkets, shops, and services that have allegedly increased prices. The 5–10 February boycott initiative will target one specific establishment on each day, starting with Big Market on 5 February, then Conad, Albmarket, Xhangolli, Eco Market, and finally SPAR.

=== Bosnia and Herzegovina ===
Inspired by efforts in Croatia, social media users in Bosnia and Herzegovina began calling for a similar boycott on 31 January. The boycott cited concerns over skyrocketing prices, noting that prices in the country were higher than those in other countries such as Germany. Furthermore, concerns were raised over the cost of living. The Bosnia and Herzegovina boycott targeted shops, restaurants, and gas stations. It aimed to pressure authorities and employers within the country to curb inflation and increase the minimum wage and standard of living.

=== Bulgaria ===
A boycott organized by the "System is Killing Us" (Note: Bulgarian: Системата ни убива, romanized: Sistemata ni ubiva) movement, the Federation of Consumers in Bulgaria, the United Pensioners' Unions, the former ombudswoman Maya Manolova, and ex-MP Velizar Enchev occurred on 13 February. In a social media post, they stated that prices in retail chains and smaller grocery stores have skyrocketed, threatening 800,000 Bulgarian pensioners living below the poverty line, as well as the working poor. They also stated that for items in foreign chains such as butter, milk, cheese, meat, and sausages, the prices were higher domestically in Bulgaria than in their home countries such as Germany or Austria, despite said home countries having a higher standard of living. The post also called for the Bulgarian government to place a price cap on the markups of 70 essential food items. The bill was drafted by Maya Manolova and her civic platform Stand Up.BG. They also called for support for medium and small-scale producers and transparency regarding pricing mechanisms. Nelly Dimitrova of the System is Killing Us stated that Bulgarians could not even afford basic essentials such as milk, eggs, or meat.

Before this boycott was organized, the deputy chairman of the VMRO – Bulgarian National Movement party, Carlos Contrera, had also called for a boycott on Facebook, again highlighting how prices for the same product had differences upwards of 20% between its price in Bulgaria and in Germany.

The boycotts since 27 February included banks because of the "unsufferably high bank fees." The organizers of the boycott insisted on the Bulgarian parliament to pass the bill for a cap on bank fees and commissions, proposed by former ombudswoman Maya Manolova. Except for boycotting, hundreds of citizens gathered in front of the Bulgarian central bank to protest against bank fees and to demand the bill to be passed.

As of 13 February, the boycott has begun in the country.

The 13 February boycott resulted in a revenue decline of 28.8% for the largest supermarket chains compared to the previous day.

=== Czech Republic ===
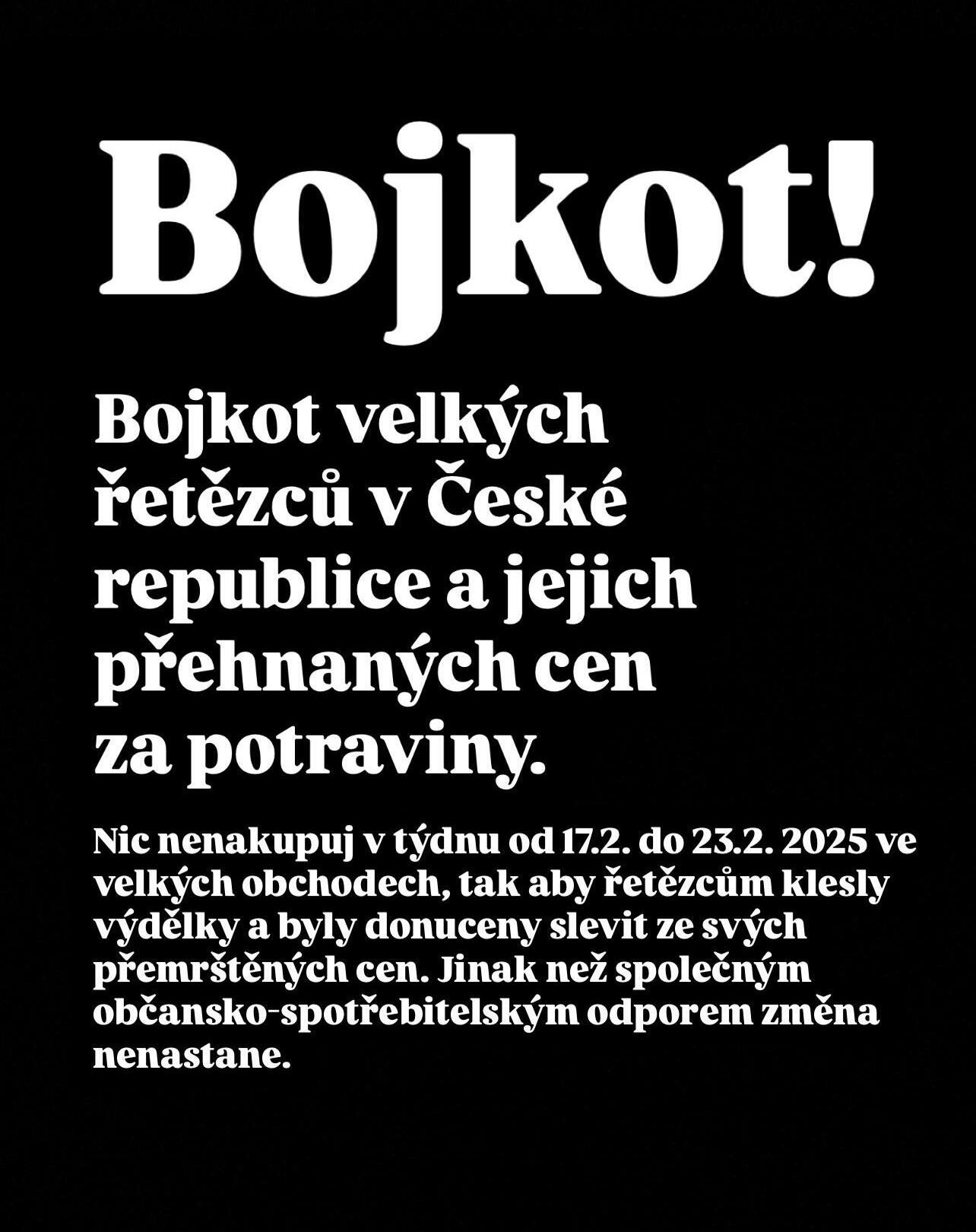
Flyer for a February 17–23 boycott of large chains in the Czech Republic so that they would drop their prices. The last sentence translates to "Change will not happen otherwise than through common citizen-consumer resistance."

A boycott initiative began to spread on Czech Reddit following the Croatian boycott. A poster on the r/Czech subreddit called for a boycott from February 17 to 23 against major retail chains. In addition to get said chains to reduce their prices, the boycott also aims to eliminate abuse of discounts (which the supporters say are actual normal prices) and oppose customer cards. Many Czechs supporting the boycott called for state support in regard to prices.

=== Greece ===
Greece has seen notable price increases within the past few years. Within the month of January 2025, fresh meat increased by 3.05%, fresh fish and seafood by 2.87%, and water, juice, and soda by 3.01%, with coffee and chocolate also seeing surges in pricing within the preceding months. A boycott on 19 February in Greece is being organized by INKA, or General Federation of Consumers of Greece. (Note: Greek: Γενική Ομοσπονδία Καταναλωτών Ελλάδας, romanized: Genikí Omospondía Katanalotón Elládas) It calls for Greeks to not spend a single euro that day, even calling for avoiding payments to banks, public services, water, electricity and telephone bills, fuel, supermarkets, cafes, restaurants, commercial stores, purchases of electrical and electronic goods, plus any financial transactions. The president of INKA, Giorgos Lechouritis, also called on the Greek government to support this measure.

=== Hungary ===
Calls for a boycott were spreading on Hungarian social media, with one organization calling for one lasting from 11 to 13 February, while another for just 13 February. The latter has become the most popular, owing to it falling on Hungarian pension day, when pensioners tend to shop disproportionately, meaning that a boycott would cancel out the sales increase that typically accompany said day. The boycott is meant to be a protest against inflation and rising food prices, with some again noting that prices in neighboring countries were cheaper. The boycott specifically targeted Aldi Süd, Lidl, SPAR, Tesco, Auchan, Penny, Coop, CBA, and G-Roby. The organizers stated that since February 13, a Thursday, was the last day of the boycott, every Thursday onward could be a boycott day. The resulting boycott was widely seen as not having any serious effect on Hungarian prices.

=== Kosovo ===
A rise in prices for consumer products has led to calls for a boycott in Kosovo. An image on social media called for a boycott from 1 to 7 February, though it has not been revealed who was behind the call. A single-day boycott on 10 February is being planned by the "Boycott Markets" group on Facebook if the price hikes have not been addressed. The boycott was called on the 10th in order to not disrupt the election campaign for the 9 February parliamentary elections in Kosovo. In addition to the rising prices, Kosovars have also complained about low wages, which when compounded with high prices, has allegedly impoverished many families, with one claiming that purchasing power was upwards of 60% lower, while the price of burek has doubled in three years. Furthermore, prices are the same in Kosovo as they are in Germany and Poland, despite the lower Kosovar salaries: a liter of milk in Kosovo costs 1.35 euros, while in Portugal it costs 0.97 euros, in Germany 1.14 euros and in Belgium 1.17 euros. Kosovar supermarkets had record profits in the year prior, according to ex-minister of foreign affairs Petrit Selimi. The boycott calls for citizens to buy from local farmers and green markets.

=== Montenegro ===
A boycott commenced in Montenegro on 31 January. Inflation in the country rose by 30.5% between 2021 and 2024, with food prices surging by as much as 41%. Retail stores experienced upwards of 50% in turnover rates from 2021 to 2023, while some had profit increases high as 200% during the same time period. Many Montenegrins complained that prices in their country were much more expensive than in other countries. The Free Trade Union of Montenegro (Note: Montenegrin: Unija slobodnih sindikata Crne Gore) had also urged its members to join the boycott.

=== North Macedonia ===
On 31 January, North Macedonia also participated in this mass boycott. The country has been undergoing similar issues regarding price surges. A "New-Year's basket" government initiative intended to resolve the issue via an optional program where retailers could reduce prices, but it was viewed as insufficient, with reports of retailers raising prices prior to decreasing them.

The boycott resulted in a revenue decline of 46.59% at the eight largest supermarket chains compared to the previous Friday and 46.29% from the previous day. The Public Revenue Office reported total revenue of 114,293,367 denars on the day of the boycott, down from 212,782,151 denars on 30 January.

=== Romania ===
Boycott calls also appeared in Romania. Romanian political figures such as Călin Georgescu, the frontrunner in the canceled 2024 Romanian presidential election, and former prime minister Victor Ponta, called on fellow citizens to initiate a boycott on 10 February that would last until 16 February. They asked for supermarkets to be boycotted not only for high prices but also for allegedly not selling Romanian products, opting instead to buy local products to encourage the national economy and promote domestic food security. Furthermore, they desired to have Romanian prices and food quality to be more in line with that of Western Europe. Companies called to be boycotted included Lidl, Kaufland, Carrefour, Mega Image, Profi and Penny Market. Romania had one of the highest inflation rates in the European Union in 2023, at 5.1%, leading to price increases for vegetables, fruits and detergents. As of 12 February, the boycott had had limited following, with a large number of Romanians continuing to shop from supermarkets. Furthermore, an anti-boycott movement appeared on social media in response to the involvement of extremist parties in the boycott.

=== Serbia ===
A boycott was initiated in Serbia on 31 January. Serbia's boycott was unique in that it occurred in the backdrop of student protests that had been ongoing in the country since November 2024, following the collapse of a train station's canopy in Novi Sad on 1 November 2024. The country has one of the highest prices in Europe, with domestic products often being cheaper in other countries. In October, four retail chains; Delhaize, Mercator S, Univerexport, and DIS, were investigated by the Serbian government over allegations of price gouging. These four companies, in addition to Lidl and Danish retail chain Jysk, who allegedly increased the prices of sleeping bags, blankets and tents shortly before the students' protest on March 15, are the targets of the boycott in Serbia. The United Trade Unions of Serbia "Sloga" urged its members to join.

=== Slovakia ===
A Facebook page called Don't Feed Us with Waste, (Note: Slovak: Nekŕmte nás odpadom) followed by over 146 thousand people, made a call on February 6 towards Slovaks, calling on them to buy nothing for a single day to express dissatisfaction over exorbitantly high food prices. The page called for a boycott specifically against Billa, Tesco, Lidl, Kaufland, and COOP Jednota. The Slovak Alliance of Modern Commerce (Note: Slovak: Slovenská aliancia moderného obchodu (SAMO)) has criticized the initiative, pointing out that prices in Slovakia are only 82% of the EU average, as opposed to Croatia's 102%.

=== Slovenia ===
Calls for a boycott in Slovenia have also commenced. Governmental data has shown that in the country, Slovenes pay on average 44% more than they did a decade prior. Despite having a lower increase in prices than average for the European Union, prices have still risen for food items such as olive oil (20%), butter (17%), meat (3–6%), and bread (2%). Slovenes frequently made comparisons to Italy, where prices were much lower. Several small scale boycotts commenced, lasting until 9 February.

During the Croatian boycotts, many Croats crossed the border into Slovenia to shop.

=== Sweden ===
A week-long boycott of Sweden's largest grocery store chains—ICA, Hemköp, Coop, Willys, City Gross and Lidl—started on 17 March. The initiative started after Annika Morina, a woman from Knivsta, questioned why the boycotts in Southeast Europe were not also happening in Sweden; she made a post on TikTok urging others to boycott during the week and the video went viral. In response to the boycott, the Swedish government announced plans to hold talks with major food producers and stakeholders. Among party leaders, Nooshi Dadgostar of the Left Party said she was planning on boycotting ICA, while Ulf Kristersson, prime minister of Sweden, said he would not boycott any Swedish businesses.

== Reactions ==
The boycotts were widely popular across the several countries. One poll showed 84% of Slovenes supporting a boycott, with 78% intending to participate. A boycott was supported by 90% of Bosnian-Herzegovinians, while 89.5% of Croats stated that they would participate in their own boycott. A similar sentiment was echoed from Macedonians. Many national politicians supported the measures. Governments in the region have also begun talks with consumer organizations and retailers to tackle the issue.

In Croatia, the government did not condemn the boycotts and on 30 January announced a price freeze on 70 consumer goods in response. The boycotts were endorsed by several Croatian parties, such as the Social Democratic Party of Croatia, Možemo, Most, and the Homeland Movement. The latter's Ante Šušnjar, the national minister of the economy, also endorsed it. The supermarket chains Kaufland and Konzum announced that they were implementing price caps on 1,000 and 250 products respectively.

In North Macedonia, the ruling VMRO-DPMNE party endorsed the boycotts. The main opposition party, SDSM, also supported them, but blamed the current government and administration of Prime Minister Hristijan Mickoski for ignoring the opposition's plans to counter the price surges while managing the issue with "fake baskets".

The Montenegrin prime minister, Milojko Spajić, supported the boycotts, with his vice minister of the economy, Nik Đeljošaj, asking the protestors to not include domestic workers. The Chamber of Commerce, whose members are owners of retail chains, and the Montenegrin Consumer Association opposed the measure.

In Bulgaria, the Plovdiv branch of the Bulgarian Socialist Party was the first party to endorse the boycott. Delyan Peevski, the leader of DPS – A New Beginning, announced that his party would introduce a law aimed at controlling prices in response to the boycott.

In Romania, Florin-Ionuț Barbu, the minister of agriculture, opposed the boycotts, stating that 70% of food products on Romanian shelves are locally made and that the boycotts would lead to the death of Romanian food processing. Former prime minister Florin Cîțu called for Romanians to boycott the state, not the retailers "where millions of Romanians work who pay the same taxes as us and are subject to the same communist regulations."

== See also ==
- Consumer activism – Type of activist behavior
- Economic activism – Another type of consumer behavior
- 1902 kosher meat boycott – 1902 New York City protest
- 1973 meat boycott – Collective economic action in the US
- Cottage cheese boycott – 2011 Israeli consumer boycott
