= List of supermarket chains in Sweden =

This is a list of supermarket chains in Sweden.

Name	Stores	Type of stores	Parent
7-Eleven	189	convenience	REITAN AS
City Gross	40	hypermarket	Axfood
Coop	665	hypermarket/supermarket	Kooperativa Förbundet
Costco Wholesale	2	hypermarket	Costco Wholesale Sweden AB
Eko	5	hypermarket/supermarket	Bergendahls
Handlar'n	217	supermarket	Axfood
Hemköp	187	hypermarket	Axfood
ICA Nära	649	convenience	ICA AB
ICA Supermarket	429	supermarket	ICA AB
ICA Kvantum	126	hypermarket/supermarket	ICA AB
ICA MAXI Stormarknad	82	hypermarket	ICA AB
Lidl	170	discount	Lidl
Matöppet	50	convenience	Bergendahls
Matrebellerna	70	convenience	Bergendahls
Pressbyrån	311	convenience	REITAN AS
Tempo	136	discount	Axfood
Willys	200	discount	Axfood

== Defunct chains ==
Name	Type of stores	Parent
Eurospar	supermarket	
SPAR	convenience	Axfood
Netto	discount	Salling Group Kooperativa Förbundet
