= Superunie =

Dutch wholesale purchasing cooperative

Coöperatieve Inkoop Vereniging Superunie B.A.
- Company type: Co-operative wholesale society
- Industry: Retail
- Founded: 1956; 70 years ago
- Headquarters: Beesd, Netherlands
- Area served: Netherlands
- Services: Group purchasing organization, collective buying power
- Owner: 10 Dutch Supermarket chains
- Website: www.superunie.nl

Superunie is a Dutch wholesale purchasing cooperative among 10 supermarket companies. Several of these 10 represent multiple supermarket brands (including brand licensing franchises). In total Superunie supplies about 1,800 stores in the Netherlands. Superunie has a market share of about 30% of the Dutch supermarket sector.

Superunie is part of European Marketing Distribution (EMD), a cooperative that has a European marketshare of about 14.8%.

== Members ==
(As of 2020)

- Boni - 44 stores
- MCD - 29 stores
- Coop - 314 stores
- Deen - 82 stores
- DetailResult which includes:
  - DekaMarkt - 81 stores
  - Dirk - 123 stores (merge of Dirk van den Broek, Bas van der Heijden and Digros)
- Hoogvliet - 51 stores
- Jan Linders Supermarkten - 61 stores
- Nettorama - 32 stores
- Picnic - Online store
- Poiesz - 80 stores
- Sperwer Groep which includes:
  - PLUS - 270 stores
  - Spar - 445 stores
- Sligro Food Group (Wholesale)
- Vomar - 69 stores

=== Former members ===
- Agrimarkt - 5 stores (taken over by Jumbo)
- Jumbo - 283 stores
- Golff (taken over by Spar, Poiesz and EMTÉ)
- Sanders (taken over by EMTÉ and Sligro)
- EMTÉ (member 1986–2019, taken over by Jumbo and Coop)

== Brands ==
Superunie offers several housebrands to its members:

- G'woon (Boni, Deen, Hoogvliet, Jan Linders, Coop, MCD Supermarkten and Vomar);
- Plus (PLUS);
- 1 de Beste (Dirk and DekaMarkt);
- Spar (Spar).

Members have the following Superunie brands in their stores:

- First Choice Cola (cola)
- Bonbébé (babyfood)
- TopVit (dairy product)
- Melkan (dairy product)
- Bumblies (babycare)
- Vismarine (fish)
- Daily Chef (instant meal)
- Schuttersbier (beer)
- Bon Appetit (nuts, cheeses, salades)
- Bakkers Weelde (cake)
- Derlon (cosmetics)
