= Samir Mane =

Albanian entrepreneur (born 1967)

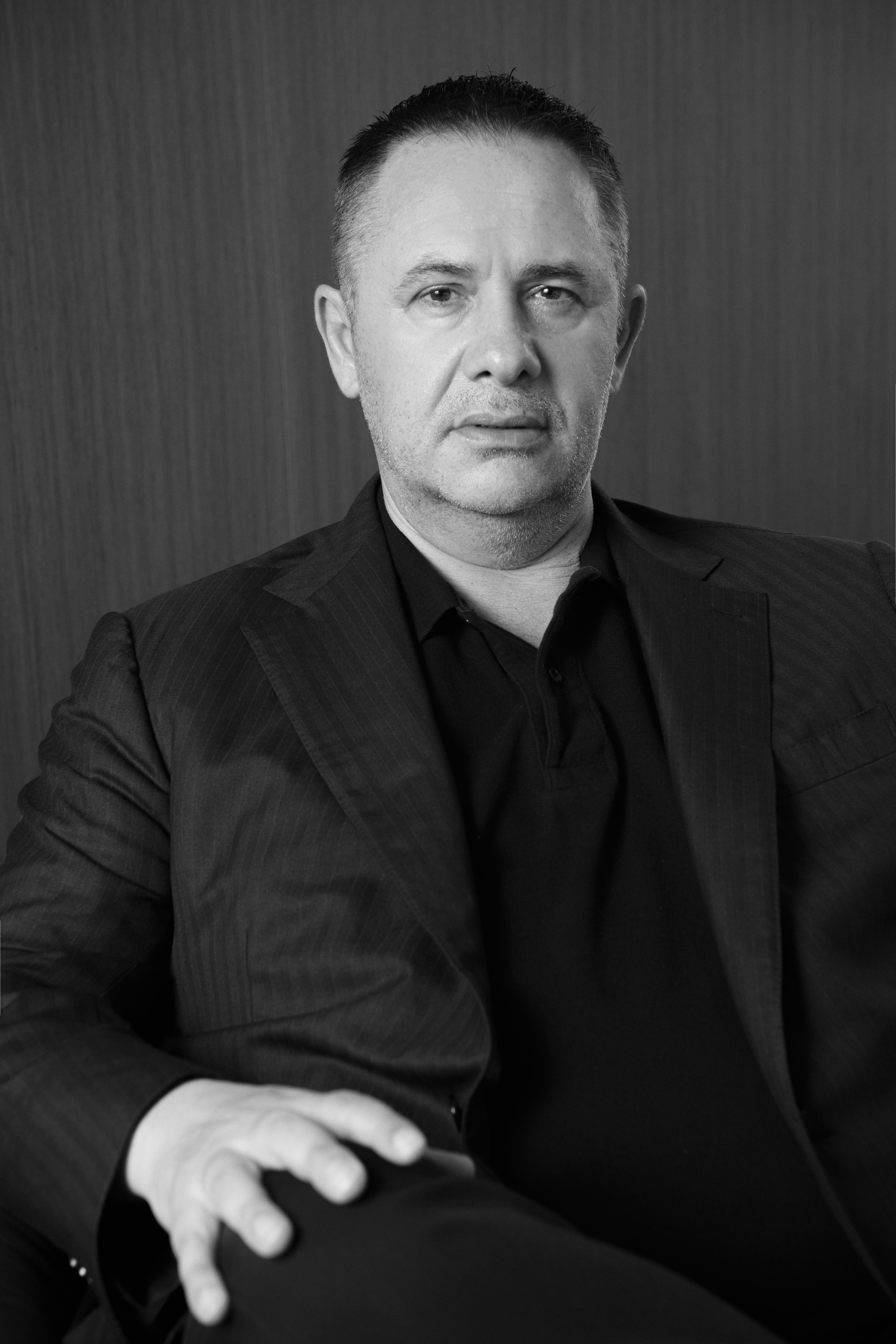
- Mane in May 2023
- Born: December 24, 1967 (age 58); Korçë, PR Albania now Albania
- Education: University of Tirana, Faculty of Geology and Mining
- Occupation: Businessman
- Known for: Founder of Balfin Group
- Spouse: Eva Mane
- Children: 4 (a girl and 3 boys)
- Website: balfingroup.com

Samir Mane (born 24 December 1967) is an Albanian businessman, the founder and president of BALFIN Group, an investment group headquartered in Tirana with interests in retail, real estate, financial services, tourism, logistics, and education. He is the group's sole owner. According to the group's own figures, BALFIN comprises around 60 companies, operates in 13 countries in Europe and North America and employs about 5,000 people.

In 2025 Mane became the first Albanian to appear on the annual Forbes list of the world's billionaires, with an estimated net worth of US$1.4 billion. On the 2026 list he ranked 2,177th, with US$1.9 billion.

== Early life and education ==
Mane was born on 24 December 1967 in Korçë, the second of three brothers. He studied geology at the Faculty of Geology and Mining of the University of Tirana. In 1991, while still a student, he left Albania: after a 36-hour bus journey he arrived in Vienna, where he registered as a refugee and spent more than six months in a refugee camp. During that time he learned German and applied to the Vienna University of Technology to continue his geology studies. In Vienna he also worked as a translator.

== Career ==
=== Beginnings: Alba-Trade and Neptun (1993–2004) ===
In 1993 Mane founded Alba-Trade in Vienna, which sold household appliances and consumer electronics from Austria in Albania. It developed into Neptun, an electronics retail chain that later expanded into North Macedonia (1998) and Kosovo (2007). In 2002 he entered real estate development through the company Mane TCI.

=== Shopping centres and regional expansion (2005–2014) ===
In 2005 Mane returned to Albania and opened Qendra Tregtare Univers (QTU) in Tirana, the country's first shopping mall, together with the Euromax supermarket chain. Tirana East Gate (TEG), the largest shopping centre in Albania, opened in 2011, and in the same year the group brought the Greek toy retailer Jumbo to the country.

In North Macedonia the group built Skopje City Mall (2012), which it sold to the UK-based company Hystead in October 2016 for €92 million, and East Gate Mall in Skopje, inaugurated on 29 October 2021 after an investment of €103 million.

For several years the group was also active in mining: it acquired AlbChrome in Albania in 2013 and NewCo Ferronikeli in Kosovo in 2018. Both were sold to the Turkish Yildirim Group; the sale of AlbChrome was completed in January 2022, and that of Ferronikeli was reported in June of the same year.

=== Tourism, financial services and retail (2015–present) ===
Construction of Green Coast, a tourist and residential resort at Palasë on the Albanian Riviera, began in 2015. The first phase opened in 2022; according to Forbes, the total cost of the project is expected to reach about US$900 million. In 2025 the Green Coast Hotel – MGallery Collection opened at the resort, with 131 rooms and suites; it is the first hotel in Albania under the MGallery brand of the French group Accor.

In March 2019 BALFIN, together with Komercijalna Banka of Skopje, acquired 98.83% of Tirana Bank from Piraeus Bank for €57.3 million, marking its entry into banking.

In July 2023 Vlora Marina, a project in which the group is a periferic participant, signed an agreement with Marriott International for a five-star hotel and branded apartments in Vlorë, valued at about €100 million.

In March 2025 the group sold the SPAR Albania chain to the Kosovo-based Viva Fresh Group, and in June of that year it signed a franchise agreement with the french all family fashion brand Kiabi and the Danish chain Flying Tiger Copenhagen to open 50 stores in the Western Balkans within four years. For 2024 BALFIN reported a consolidated net profit of €113 million, 28% more than a year earlier; according to the group, consolidated EBITDA for 2025 was €163 million.

In education, Tirana Business University became part of the group in 2014; in 2023 BALFIN became its main shareholder and took over its management.

=== Expansion beyond the region ===
==== Austria ====
According to the group, by May 2025 BALFIN had invested more than €100 million in Austria in residential and mixed-use projects in Vienna and Gmunden. In 2025–2026 it acquired in Vienna the former Federal Railways directorate building (Bundesbahndirektionsgebäude) and a 16,000 m² commercial property at Nordbahnstraße 50, with the aim of growing its Austrian portfolio to €200 million.

==== United States and Canada ====
Balfin Americas, the group's North American arm, was established in New York City in 2023. By November 2025 it had made four real estate investments in the states of New York and New Jersey, among them the 340 Mount Kemble office complex in Morristown, whose acquisition with American partners was announced in March 2025. In May 2024 the group announced its first project in Canada, a 27-unit residential development in Vancouver valued at about €40 million.

==== Agreement with Jumbo S.A. ====
In May 2026 BALFIN and the Greek company Jumbo S.A. signed an agreement extending their exclusive partnership to six new markets: Armenia, Azerbaijan, Georgia, Kazakhstan, Ukraine and Uzbekistan. Until then BALFIN had represented the brand in Albania, Kosovo, Bosnia and Herzegovina, Montenegro and Moldova. Under the agreement the group will set up a logistics hub in China and manage the supply chain for the new markets itself.

==== Partnering with International Finance Institutions ====
In August 2026 the International Finance Corporation (IFC), a member of the World Bank Group, disclosed a proposed €140 million loan package for BALFIN to support its retail entry into Ukraine and the South Caucasus and tourism development in Albania.

==== Germany ====
In August 2026 the trade newspaper Immobilien Zeitung reported that BALFIN was close to buying the historic former Tietz department store next to Munich's central station, part of the insolvency estate of the Signa group, for an expected price of €110–120 million. In September it was reported that the group was also buying the Galeria department store buildings in Hanover and Bonn. According to a profile published that month in the Frankfurter Allgemeine Zeitung, the group plans to enter the German market through the purchase of the Tietz building. According to these reports, as of September 2026 the purchases had not been officially confirmed as completed.

== Wealth ==
Forbes first included Mane on its billionaires list in 2025, in 2,356th place, with US$1.4 billion. In April of that year the magazine published a profile describing him as Albania's first and only billionaire. On the 2026 list he ranked 2,177th, with an estimated net worth of US$1.9 billion.

== Philanthropy ==
In 2023, on the group's 30th anniversary, the Mane Foundation was established; it supports initiatives in education, the environment, health and poverty alleviation.

== Personal life ==
Mane is married to Eva Mane and has four children, three sons and a daughter. The family moved from Vienna to Tirana in 2005. He lives in Tirana.

== Honours and recognition ==
- 2008: The Financial Times included him in its list "Who's who: People to watch in business".
- 2012–2023: Honorary consul of Thailand in Albania.
- 2016: The title "For Special Civil Merits" (Për Merita të Veçanta Civile), awarded by President Bujar Nishani.
- 2019: Decoration of Honour for Services to the Republic of Austria, conferred by President Alexander Van der Bellen and presented on 8 July 2019 in Tirana by Ambassador Johann Sattler, for his role in the Albanian economy and in ties between the two countries.

== See also ==
- Balfin Group
- The World's Billionaires
- List of Albanians
