= Tirana Logistic Park =

Logistics service company in Albania

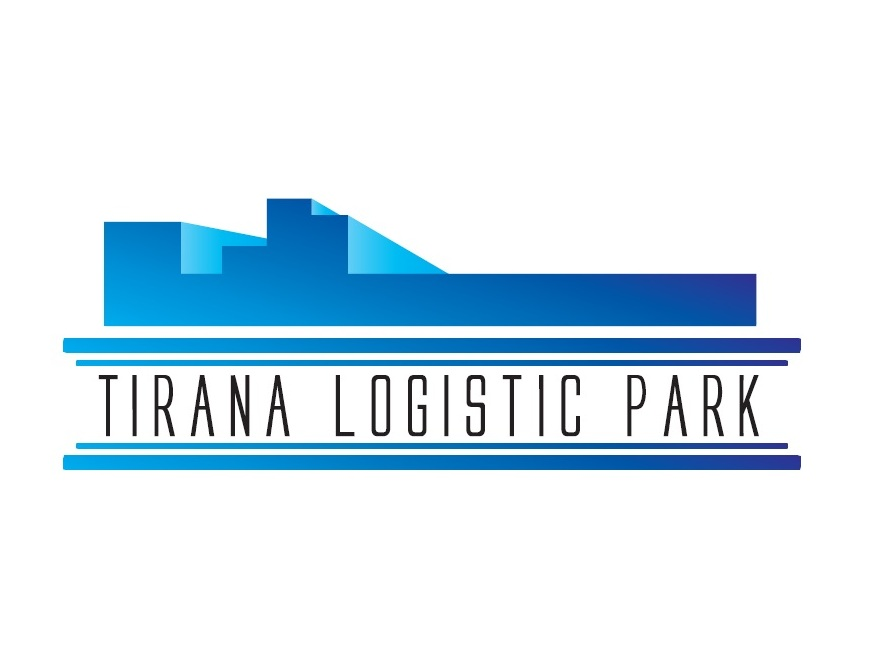
- Company type: Private
- Industry: Logistics
- Founded: 2013
- Headquarters: Tirana, Albania
- Key people: Alket Hajdini
- Subsidiaries: Balfin Group
- Website: tlp.al

Tirana Logistic Park (TLP) is an Albanian company that offers logistic services in Albania. Tirana Logistic Park is a project of 3 "Class A" warehouses along the Tirana–Durrës highway. Its 80,000 square metres (860,000 sq ft) of buildings on 200,000 square metres (2,200,000 sq ft) of land met European standards in storage and manufacturing. This logistic park was opened on October.

== History ==
Tirana Logistic Park is a project designed by Samir Mane, though construction did not begin until 2012.

In 2013, the first phase of the construction was finished. The inaugural ribbon was cut by Michael D. Granoff (Chairman of the Albanian-American Enterprise Fund), Idajet Ismailaj, Lulzim Basha, Niko Peleshi, Aleksandër Arvizu and Samir Mane.

== Services ==
The park has a dedicated railway spur line. The storage spaces include the utilities needed for processing containers. The services are agreed to be guaranteed by an agreement with Milsped.

== Location ==
The logistic park is positioned within a radius of 30 km (19 mi) between Tirana and Durrës. The park is next to the railway and the Port of Durrës.
