= Franc Berneker =

Slovenian sculptor and architect

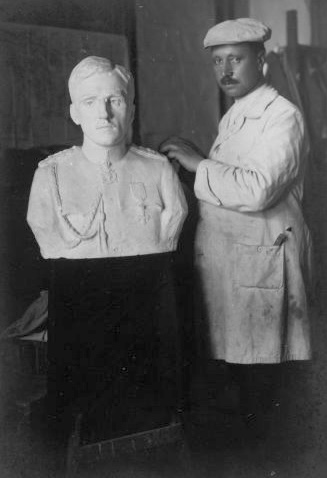
Franc Berneker (1910)

Franc Berneker (October 4, 1874 – May 16, 1932) was a 19th- and early-20th-century Slovene tomb sculptor, who had a strong impact on Slovenj Gradec gaining recognition for his work in bronze, marble and monuments. His art focus went from realism to modernism to psychology, drama and an exploration of the relationship between worked and unworked, smooth and rough. He studied with Edmund von Hellmer at the Vienna Academy of Fine Arts and Ivan Zajec on monuments of national heroes His art work is displayed at the Resau Art Nouveau Network.

== List of sculptures ==
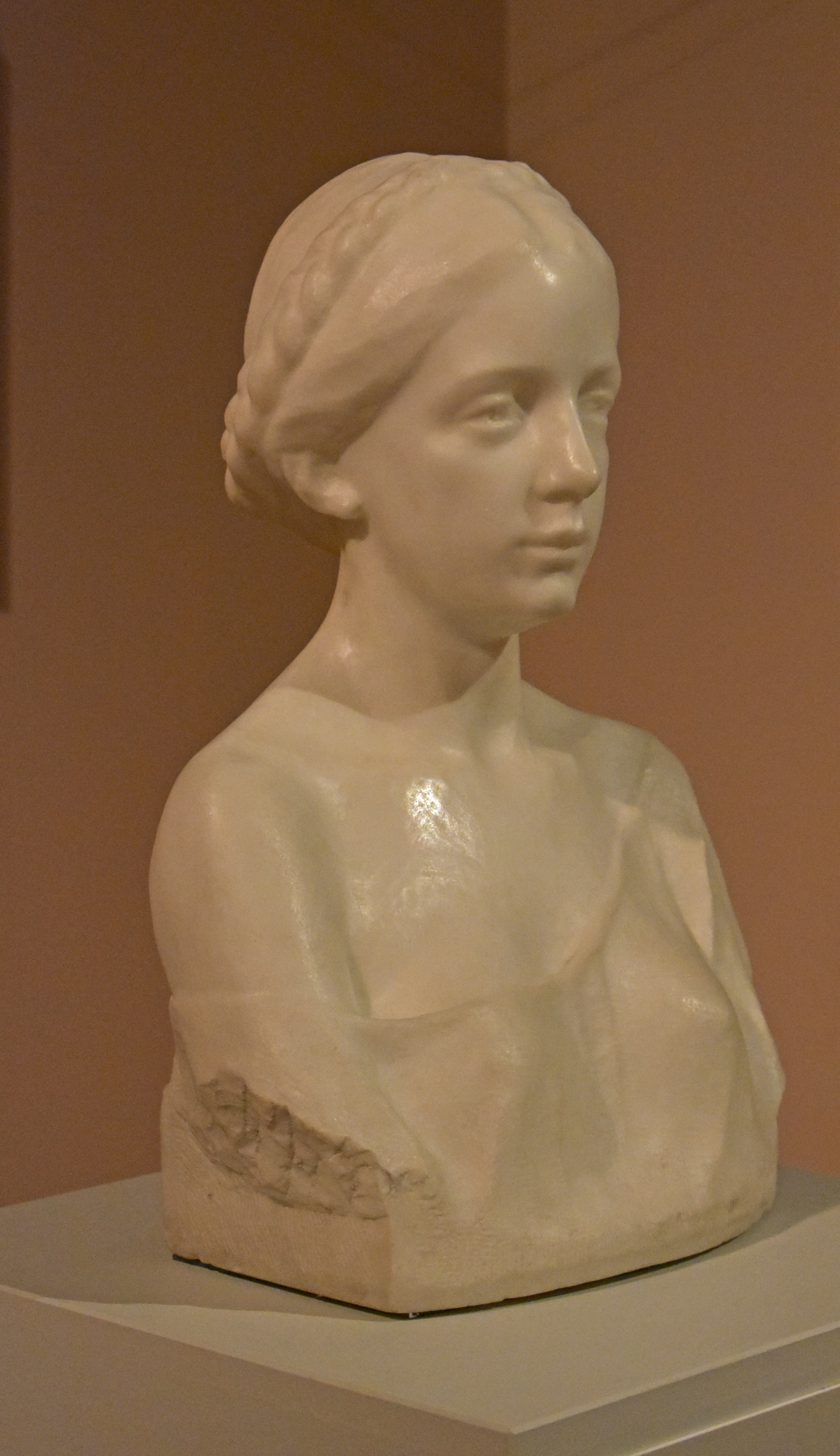
A girl (1910)

Below is a list of some of Berneker's sculptures:

1. A Girl
2. Gradišče, Slovenj Gradec
3. The Drowned Couple
4. Oton Župančič
5. Drama
6. Victims
7. Zdenka Vidic and Mira Ban
8. Female Head
9. Wrestlers
10. Monument commemorating Trubar
11. Model for Turner's Tomb
12. Model for a Monument for Adamič and Lunder.

== Exhibitions ==
Berneker's work has been shown around the world in museums including:

1. Belgrade (1912)
2. Bled (1911)
3. Celje (1940)
4. Ljubljana (1902, 1911, 1912, 1913, 1938, 1940)
5. London (1906)
6. Slovenj Gradec (1984, 2001)
7. Trieste (1907)
8. Vienna (1904, 2003).
