= List of shopping malls in Albania =

This is a list of shopping centers that currently operate within Albania.

== Tiranë ==
Toptani Shopping Center

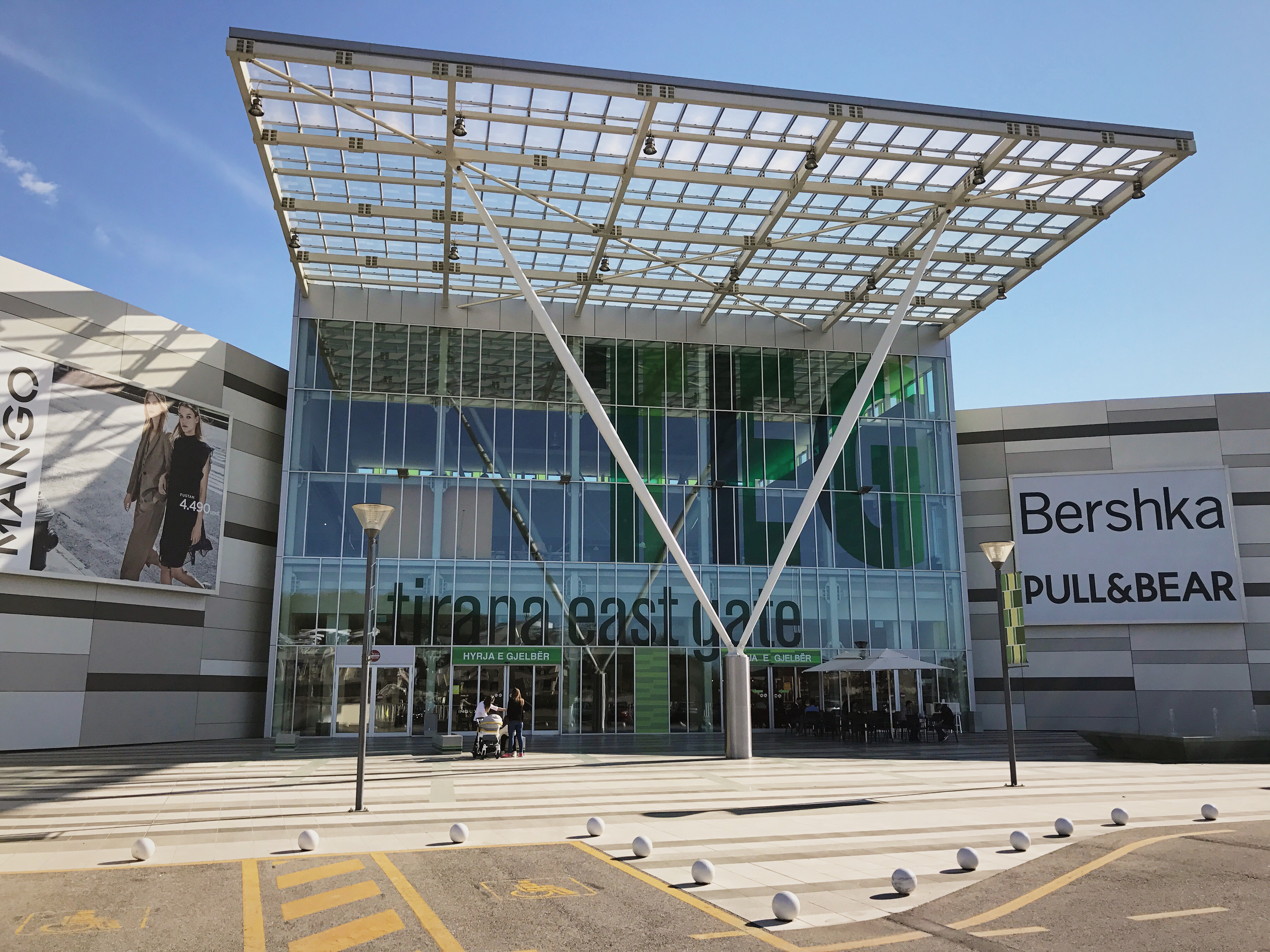
Back entrance of Tirana East Gate mall

Name	Retail space	Shops
TEG	96,000 sq.m	150
Toptani Shopping Center	60,000 sq.m	80
QTU	47,000 sq.m	70
Citypark	40,600 sq.m	180
Tirana Ring Center	24,000 sq.m	60
Concord Center	20,000 sq.m	100
Mega Outlet (Casa Italia)	16,000 sq.m	50
Kristal Center	10,500 sq.m	40
Condor Center	10,000 sq.m	80
Galeria ETC	9,000 sq.m	70
ABA (Coin)	6,000 sq.m	5 floors

== Durrës ==
Name	Retail space	Shops
Flagship Center	15,000 sq.m	70
Galaktik	9,000 sq.m	55
Blue Star	sq.m	30

== Fier ==
Name	Retail space	Shops
Fier Trade Center	13,200 sq.m	60
Gold Center	7,735 sq.m	50
Qendra Tregtare VIVA	25,000 sq.m	-

== Other cities ==
Name	Retail space	Shops
Orti (Elbasan)	5,900 sq.m
QTU Riviera (Vlorë)	4,000 sq.m	35
QTPK	sq.m	64
Metropol Center (Lushnje)	sq.m

== See also ==
- List of supermarket chains in Albania
