= European Marketing Distribution =

European Marketing Distribution (EMD) is a European purchasing organization for grocery stores. EMD was established in 1989 and is based in Switzerland.

EMD is currently active in 20 countries with 55,000 points of sale. It has 13 members and has a European market share of 14%.

== Affiliations ==
=== Current affiliations ===
| Country | Name | Affiliation | Headquarters |
|---|---|---|---|
| Australia | Woolworths Group | 2017 | Bella Vista |
| Austria | Markant Oesterreich GmbH | 1989 | Vienna |
| Bulgaria | Kaufland Bulgaria | 2016 | |
| Croatia | Kaufland Croatia | 2016 | |
| Czech Republic | Markant C.E.S. s.r.o. | 2000 | Prague |
| Denmark | Dagrofa | 2002 | Brøndby |
| Germany | Markant Deutschland GmbH | 1989 | Offenburg |
| Germany | Kaufland | 2016 | Neckarsulm |
| Germany | Globus | 2017 | Sankt Wendel |
| Italy | ESD Italia S.r.l. | 2003 | Segrate |
| Netherlands | C.I.V. Superunie B.A. | 2006 | Beesd |
| New Zealand | Woolworths | 2017 | Auckland |
| Norway | Unil/NorgesGruppen ASA | 2007 | Oslo |
| Poland | Kaufland Poland | 2016 | |
| Portugal | EuromadiPort S.G.C.A. S.A. | 2007 | Lisbon |
| Romania | Kaufland Romania | 2016 | |
| Russia | Lenta Russia | 2017 | St. Petersburg |
| Slovakia | Markant Slovensko s.r.o. | 2000 | Bratislava |
| Spain | Euromadi Ibérica S.A. | 1989 | Esplugues |
| South Korea | Homeplus | 2019 | Seoul |
| Sweden | Axfood | 1995 | Stockholm |
| Switzerland | Markant AG | 2010 | Pfäffikon |

=== Former affiliations ===
| Country | Name | Affiliation | Headquarters |
|---|---|---|---|
| Ireland | Musgrave PLC | 1992–2015 | Cork |
| United Kingdom | Asda Stores Ltd | 2016–2017 | Leeds |

=== Affiliation unclear ===
| Country | Name | Affiliation | Headquarters |
|---|---|---|---|
| Finland | Tuko Logistics Osuuskunta | 2002–2019? | Kerava |
| France | EMC Distribution S.A.S. | 2011–? | Paris |
