= Neptun Electronics =

Albanian consumer electronics company

- Company type: Private
- Industry: Retail
- Founded: 2001; 25 years ago
- Headquarters: Tirana, Albania
- Number of locations: 31 in Albania, 15 in Kosovo
- Area served: Albania, Kosovo, North Macedonia, and Bosnia and Herzegovina
- Products: Consumer Electronics
- Parent: Balfin Group
- Website: neptun.al

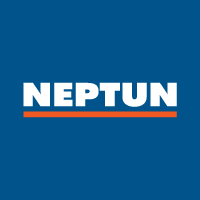
Neptun logo

Neptun is the largest chain of consumer electronics in Albania and among the companies with the highest growth in the region. It provides retail sales of electronic products from TVs, computers, phones, home appliances, etc. With 31 stores in Albania and constantly expanding, Neptun is present in all major cities throughout the country.

On 25 April, 2025, Neptun opened its 15th store in Kosovo, and its 1st store in Bosnia and Herzegovina on 17 October, 2024.

== See also ==
- List of companies of Albania
