= Eco Market =

- Type: Supermarket chain
- Industry: Supermarket; Grocery
- Founded: 2013; 13 years ago Tirana, Albania
- Headquarters: Tirana Albania
- Number of locations: 25
- Area served: Tirana; Durrës; Fier; Shkodër
- Products: Bakery; Grocery; Deli; Produce; Seafood; Meats; Dairy
- Website: ecomarket.al

Eco Market is a retail chain of supermarkets based in Tirana, Albania. Established in February 2013, the chain has expanded its operations with the opening of 19 stores mainly in the Tirana-Durrës metropolitan region and in Fier region. It manages a wide variety of products with the Eco brand name which it supplies to other major distribution chains in the country such as Big Market, Conad, and Carrefour.

== History ==
In 2013, Eco Market started expanding with the successful launch of 6 markets in 10 months of service. In 2014 with they inaugurated six more markets. Then in April 2015 the successful launch of the other three shops in Tirana. The latest store in 2015 was another supermarket in hypermarket format. Since December 2015, the company has 25 shops in function in Tirana, Durrës, Elbasan, Fier and many more regions of Albania. Eco Market has opened 1 market in 2 months and by the end of 2017. It has 25 markets in service today, with a labor force of over 200 employees.

== See also ==
- List of supermarket chains in Albania
