= DekaMarkt =

Dutch supermarket chain

- Industry: Retail
- Founded: Velsen-Noord, Netherlands (1941)
- Founder: Dirk Kat
- Number of locations: 81
- Area served: Netherlands
- Key people: Pieter Rozendaal (CEO)
- Products: Supermarkets, Convenience stores, Small hypermarkets
- Parent: Detailresult Groep N.V.
- Website: www.dekamarkt.nl

DekaMarkt is a Dutch retail company which operates a chain of supermarkets in the country. DekaMarkt is a member of Superunie, a Dutch purchasing organization for supermarkets. DekaMarkt has stores in North Holland, South Holland, Gelderland, Overijssel and Flevoland.

== History ==
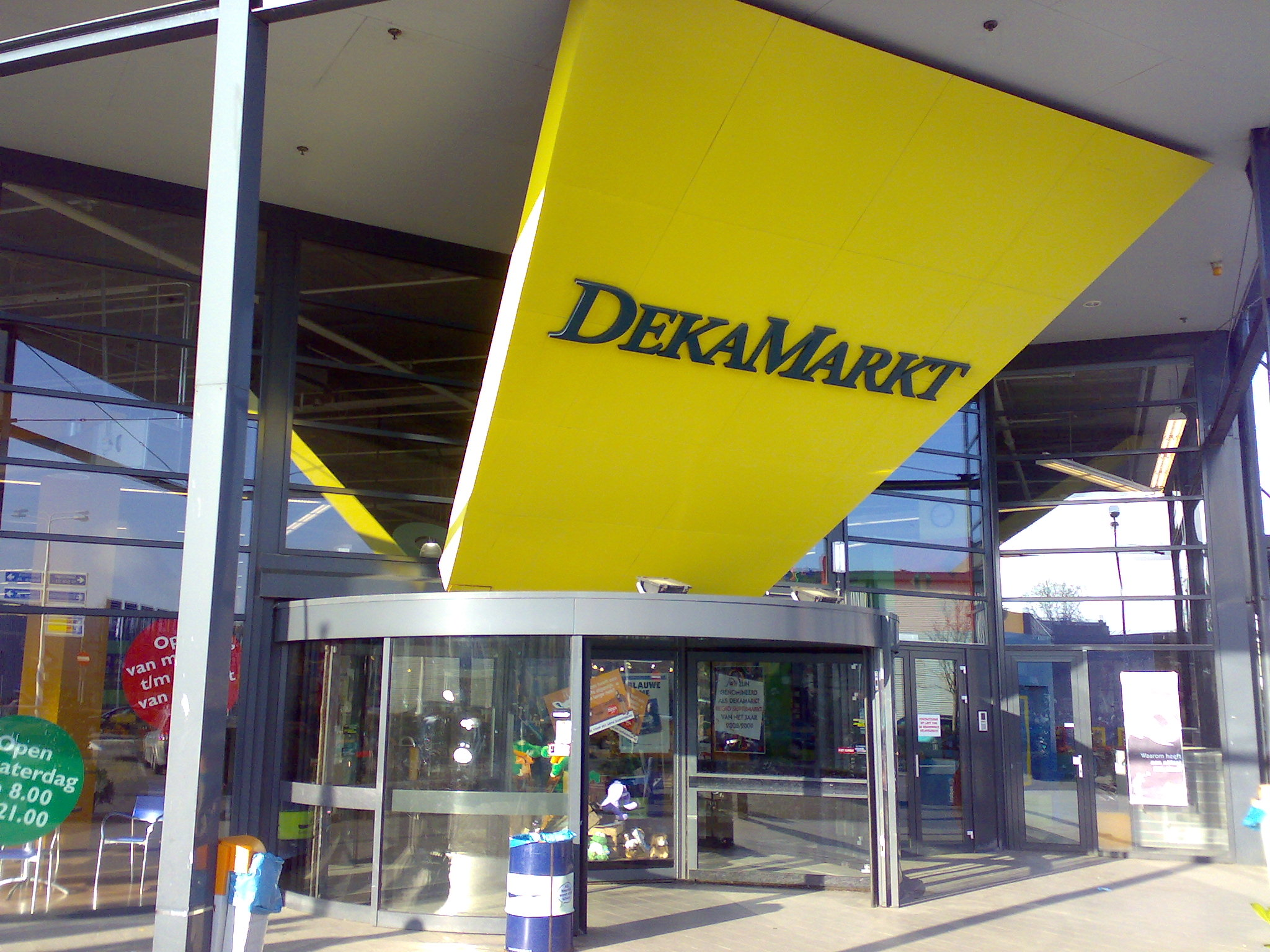
A DekaMarkt store in Beverwijk.

Dutch businessman Dirk Kat opened his first grocery store in Velsen-Noord in 1941, but it had to close in 1944 as a result of the German occupation of the Netherlands. In 1949, under his leadership, the first complete self-service store of the Netherlands opened its doors under the name Kijkgrijp. In 1950, Kat established joint purchasing with other grocers so that together they could guarantee low prices to their customers. In 1952, Kat built a central warehouse, which was the forerunner of the distribution centres. In 1955, the first modern supermarket in the Netherlands was opened in IJmuiden. This supermarket also sold fresh products such as bread, meat and vegetables.

From 1969, the name DekaMarkt was introduced at the stores in Wormerveer and Zaandam, and it would eventually be introduced at all stores by 1986. Deka is derived from the initials of Dirk Kat. In 1974, the first liquor store DekaMarkt Slijterij was opened.

=== Merger with Dirk ===
Since 2001, the company had been maintaining a close cooperation with Dutch supermarket chain Dirk.

In 2008, the supermarket entered a merger with Dirk to form Detailresult Groep. Both supermarket formulas continued to exist side by side. At the beginning of 2013, the DekaMarkt stores were converted to a new formula, which would give them the look and feel of a real market.

== Other activities ==
In addition to the supermarket activities, the company has a wine shop and a garden centre. The Deka Wine Market (Deka Wijnmarkt) opened on 17 October 2007, in Beverwijk. This is now closed and the wine range is in the shop itself. The garden centre, DekaTuin, opened its doors in March 2008 in Heiloo, and later a second location was added in Haarlem. DekaMarkt also has a petrol station on the same site. Furthermore, DekaMarkt has its own production company with bakeries, cattle and agriculture and a butcher's shop and has several distribution centres and fresh produce centres. Since 2011, the company has its own delivery service.
