= List of supermarket chains in Albania =

This is a list of the main supermarket chains that currently operate within Albania. These chains are the successful leaders of the consumer goods market in the locations they operate at.

== Current chains ==
Name	Type	Parent company	Stores
Cash&Carry Elbasan	Supermarket, hypermarket	Planet Kb	3
Spar Albania	Supermarket, hypermarket	Viva Fresh (formerly Balfin Group)	124
Conad	Supermarket, hypermarket	Conad	30
Eco Market	Supermarket	Eco Market	25
Extra Market	Supermarket, hypermarket	Extra Market	13
Big Market	Supermarket, hypermarket	Big Market	135
Market Xhangolli	Supermarket	Market Xhangolli	18
Pronatyra MD	Supermarket	Pronatyra MD	12
Diambe Market	Supermarket	Diambe Market	64

== Ceased operations ==
- Praktiker
- Mercator
- Carrefour
- HIPPO markets
- Mercato Italia

== Specialty store chains ==
=== Clothing ===
|- | Zara Albania | 1 | Zara |- |- | H&M Albania | 1 | H&M |-

== See also ==
- List of shopping malls in Albania
