= Skopje East Gate =

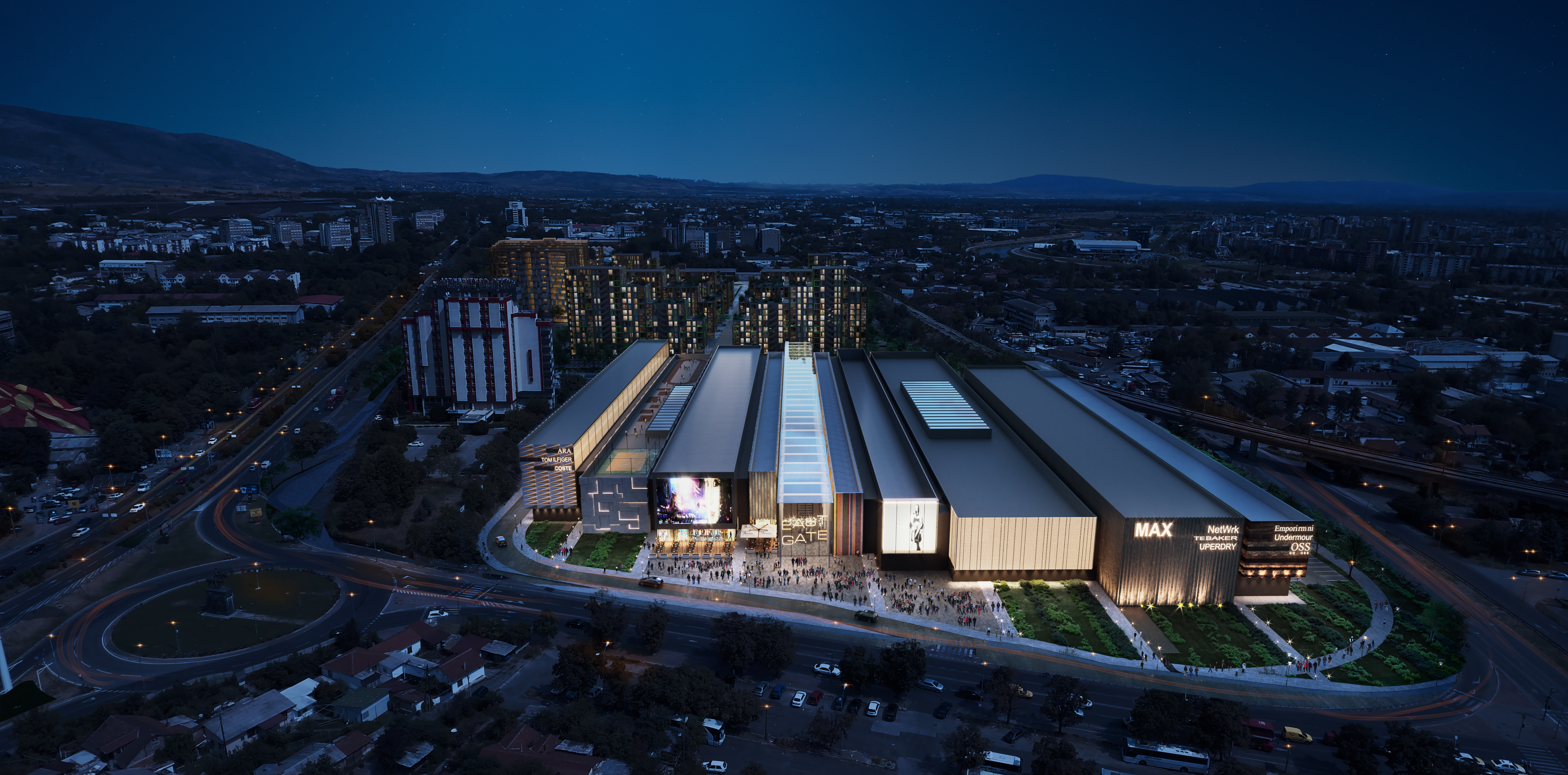
- Location: Skopje, North Macedonia
- Coordinates: 42°00′00″N 21°25′59.9″E
- Opened: 29 October 2021
- Owner: Balfin Group
- Architect: Kerem Yazgan, Begüm Yazgan
- Floor area: 168,000 m^{2} (1,810,000 sq ft)
- Website: eastgate.mk

Skopje East Gate (Macedonian: Скопје ист гејт), simply known as East Gate, is a mixed-development project incorporating a shopping and entertainment center, a residential complex and an office park based in Skopje, North Macedonia. It is located about 3 kilometers east from the center of Skopje.

The shopping and entertainment center called East Gate Mall, opened on October 29 and by far is the largest shopping mall in North Macedonia, and the third largest overall in the region of the Balkans.

== Overview ==
Skopje East Gate's total area is 500,000 m^{2} (5,400,000 sq ft), of which 201,000 m^{2} (2,160,000 sq ft) are reserved for the residential area consisting of 627 residential units, 57,000 m^{2} (610,000 sq ft) for the shopping and entertainment center "East Gate Mall", 50,000 m^{2} (540,000 sq ft) for the business office area and 25,000 m^{2} (270,000 sq ft) for green area consisting of parks.

This project was announced in 2017 by Balfin Group CEO Samir Mane. On June 1, 2018, in an event in which the prime minister of North Macedonia Zoran Zaev, Samir Mane and other political and business figures took place, it was announced that the project will be finished during the fall in 2021 and would be an investment of 350 million euros, by far the largest foreign investment ever in North Macedonia.

== East Gate Living ==
East Gate Living is the residential complex part of Skopje East Gate with an area of 201,000 m^{2} (2,160,000 sq ft) consisting of four buildings and 25,000 m^{2} (270,000 sq ft) for the green area. The four residential buildings are located with a distance of 50 metres (160 ft) between one-another, with 20 floorplans. The four residential buildings offer 672 residential units, with apartments ranging from 42 to 210 m^{2} (450 to 2,260 sq ft).

== East Gate Mall ==
East Gate Mall (Macedonian: Ист гејт мол) also known as East Gate Shopping is the largest shopping mall in Skopje, with a total retail area of 57,000 m^{2} (610,000 sq ft) and 2000 parking places. East Gate Mall is a five floor building and it has over 220 international and local shopping brands, a hypermarket, electronics shops and other services. It also has the gastronomy area with multiple choices of cuisines and over 800 seats. The mall also has five Café Avenues, a fitness center, a video playground and 8 Cineplexx Cinemas theatres.

In East Gate Shopping are located world known brands like Zara (retailer), Bershka, Calvin Klein (fashion house), Tommy Hilfiger (company), Adidas, Nike, istyle, Kiko Milano, Massimo Dutti, OYSHO, Stradivarius. East Gate Mall also debuted 40 new brands in the Macedonian shopping lifestyle like Twinset, Patrizia Pepe, Valentino (fashion house), Burberry, Armani, DSquared2, Mango, Philipp Plein, Michael Kors, etc.
