= Dirk van den Broek =

Dutch businessman (1924–2020)

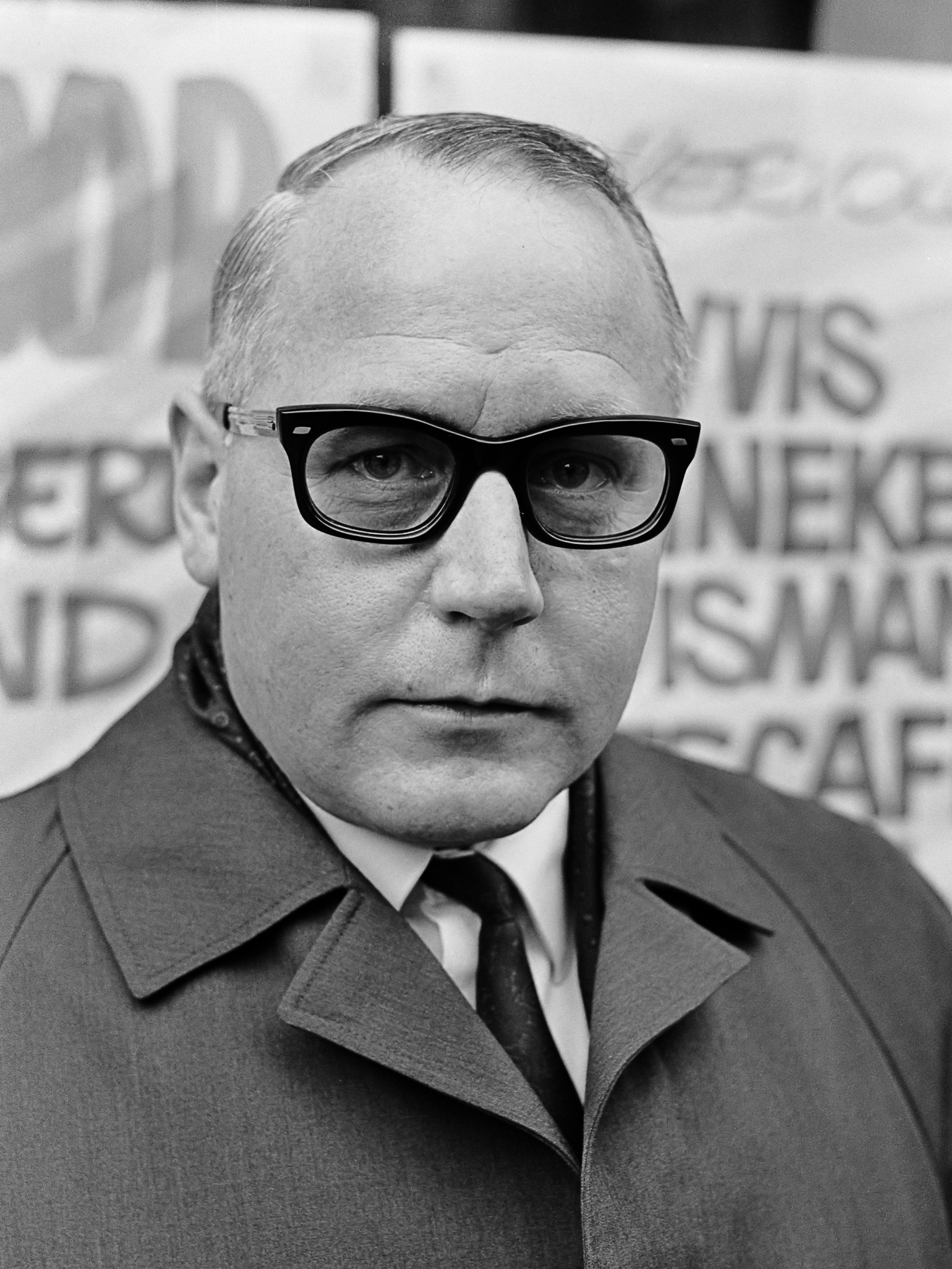
Dirk van den Broek (1967)

Dirk van den Broek (Dutch pronunciation: [ˈdɪr(ə)k fɑn də(m) ˈbruk]; 27 March 1924 – 8 April 2020) was a Dutch businessman. He was the founder of Cooperating Dirk van den Broek Companies. In 2014 some of his stores were renamed Dirk.

== Early life ==
Van den Broek was born in Amsterdam in 1924. At the age of 15, he started selling milk throughout the city.

== Career ==
In 1942, Van den Broek opened his first business, a small dairy store in his home neighbourhood. By 1953, he had expanded his small dairy business into a supermarket, which was the first of its kind in Amsterdam.

He kept his business growing by adopting an acquisition strategy, taking over local grocery stores. Later he started D-reizen, a popular travel agency. This company is one of the oldest family-owned businesses in the Netherlands.

He owned over 120 stores in cities across the country.

Van den Broek was knighted as Officer in the Order of Orange Nassau in 1990 by Queen Beatrix of the Netherlands.

== Personal life ==
He was married and was a father to his five children. His children have been actively involved in the family business.

Dirk van den Broek died in Aerdenhout at the age of 96.
