= Tirana East Gate =

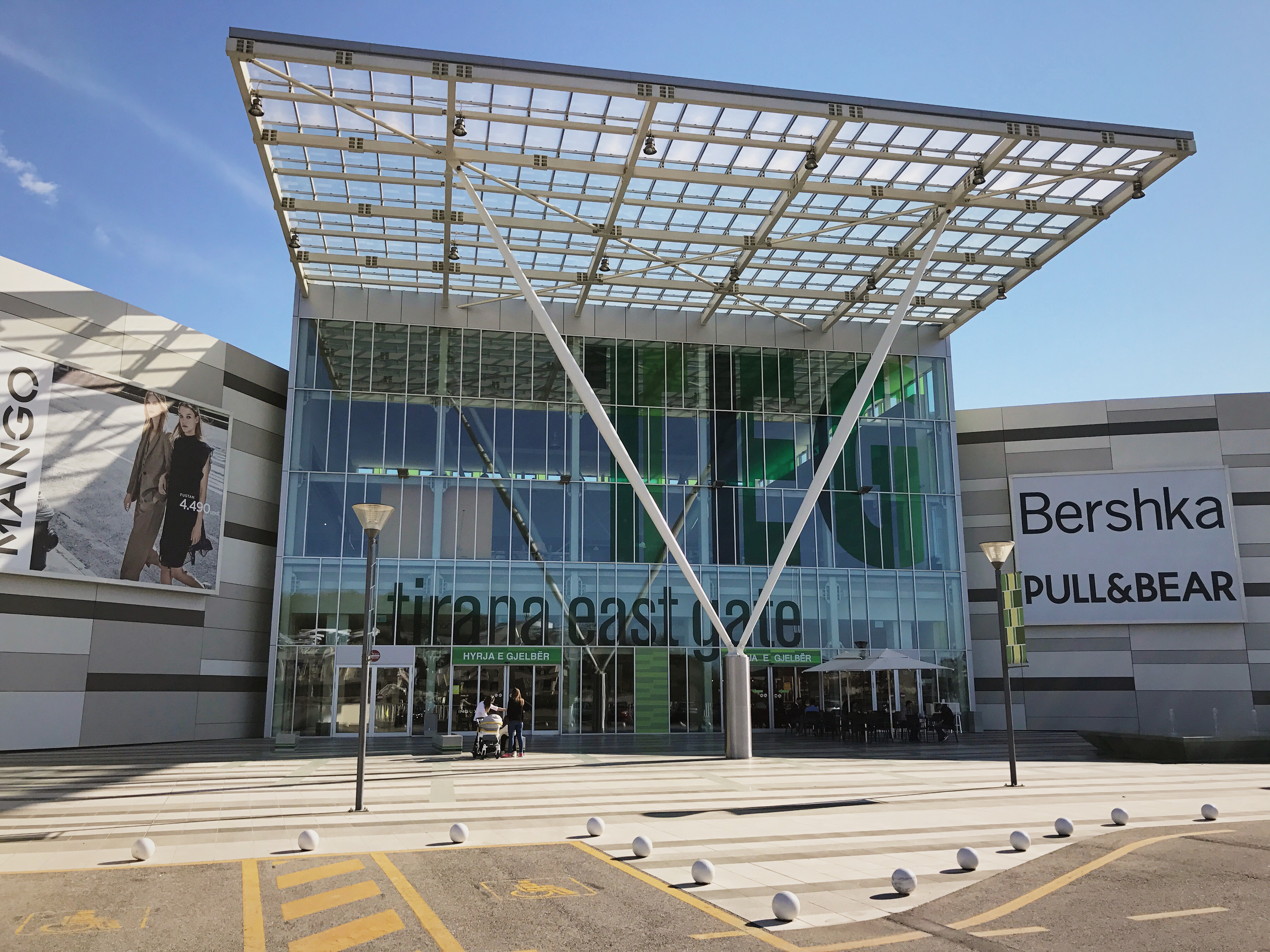
- The back entrance
- Location: Tirana, Albania
- Coordinates: 41.2831°N 19.8573°E
- Opened: 26 November 2011; 14 years ago
- Manager: Balfin Group
- Num. of stores: 180
- Num. of anchor tenants: 3
- Floor area: 96,000 m^{2} (1,030,000 sq ft)
- Floors: 4
- Parking: 4200
- Website: www.teg.al

Tirana East Gate (TEG) is a shopping mall based in Tirana, Albania. It is located about 4 kilometres (2.5 mi) from the city center of Tirana just off the National Road SH3 in Lundër.

The mall was inaugurated on 26 November 2011 by former Prime Minister of Albania, Sali Berisha and other representatives of the Albanian government. Covering two floors, the mall has about 96,000 m^{2} (1,030,000 sq ft) of retail space. It accommodates 180 shops, 10 bars, cafes and 5 restaurants. Approximately 4,200 parking spaces are available. Around 2,000 people are employed here.

List of prominent stores includes LTB, FLO, ELLE, Spar, Zara, Massimo Dutti, Pull and Bear, Bershka, Timberland, Calzedonia, LC Waikiki, Reebok, Adidas, Rossmann, Mango, Geox, Swarovski, Nike, Swatch, H&M, Jumbo, i DO, and Flying Tiger Copenhagen.

KFC, Pizza Hut, Burger King, Popeyes and Firehouse Subs are also located in the Mall.

The Mall also features a Cineplexx multiplex cinema.

2 bus lines connect the city with the Tirana East Gate.

== See also ==
- Economy of Albania
- List of shopping malls in Albania
