= Citypark Albania =

- Logo of Citypark Tirana
- Location: Tirana, Albania
- Coordinates: 41°22′05″N 19°41′14″E
- Opened: 19 December 2009; 16 years ago
- Manager: Colliers International
- Owner: AM Group
- Num. of stores: 180
- Floor area: 64,000 m^{2} (690,000 sq ft)
- Floors: 2
- Parking: 3500 parking spots
- Website: citypark.al

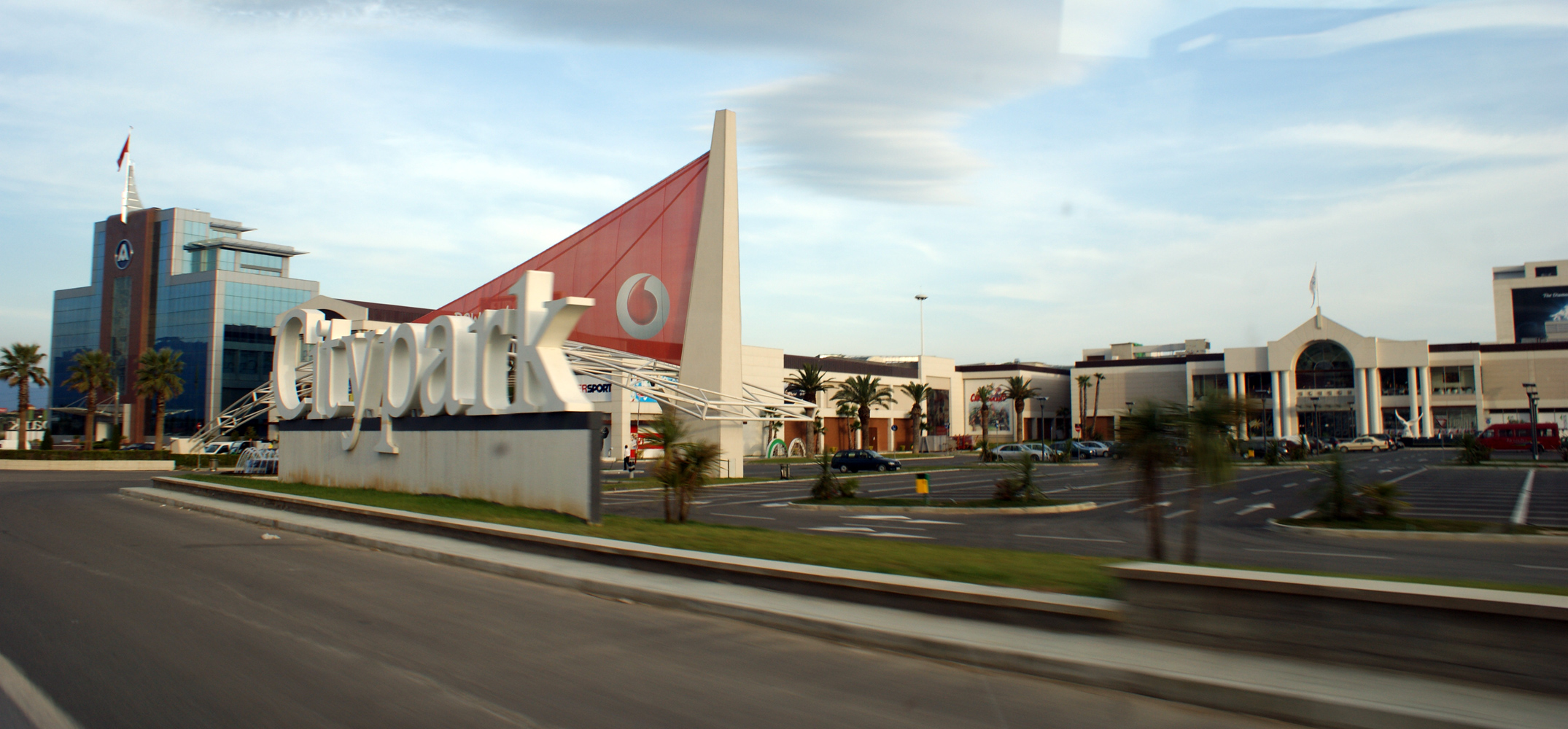
The mall seen from the highway

Citypark Albania is a shopping mall in Albania. located along the Durrës – Tirana highway. It is Albania's second-largest shopping centre, with 180 shops, a supermarket, a food court, a hotel, an ice-skating ring, Cartoonland, and other entertainment areas. The shopping center is 12 km away from the centre of Tirana, 8 km from the Kamëz Crossing, and 7.5 km from the Tirana International Airport Mother Teresa. The shopping mall was constructed by AM Group, a local company. The total cost of the investment has been estimated at 80 million euros.

== Description ==
City Park Albania has attracted the interest of international retailers interested in expanding into the area. Colliers International, a major real estate services firm, secured new retailers such as Euronics, Mercator and Intersport to lease space in Albania's Citypark shopping centre. Other major retailers including Calvin Klein, Lacoste, Cacharel, Toi & Moi, Societta, AltinBas, Primo Emporio, Kolonat,Versace, One2Play and Chicco.

The Citypark shopping centre is a large development for Tirana's population. It totals 111,000 square meters of built-up area and 3,000 parking stalls. The Citypark development offers services apart from shopping that include cafés, a hotel with conference high-tech facilities, a concert hall, and other leisure venues for families.
