= Dirk (supermarket) =

Dutch supermarket chain

- Founded: 1942, Netherlands
- Founder: Dirk van den Broek
- Number of locations: 120 stores (July 2018)
- Area served: Netherlands
- Products: Supermarkets, Convenience stores
- Owner: Detailresult Groep N.V
- Website: dirk.nl

Dirk (Dutch: [ˈdɪr(ə)k]), formerly Dirk van den Broek (Dutch: [ˈdɪr(ə)k fɑn də(m) ˈbruk]), is a supermarket chain that operates 121 stores in the Netherlands.

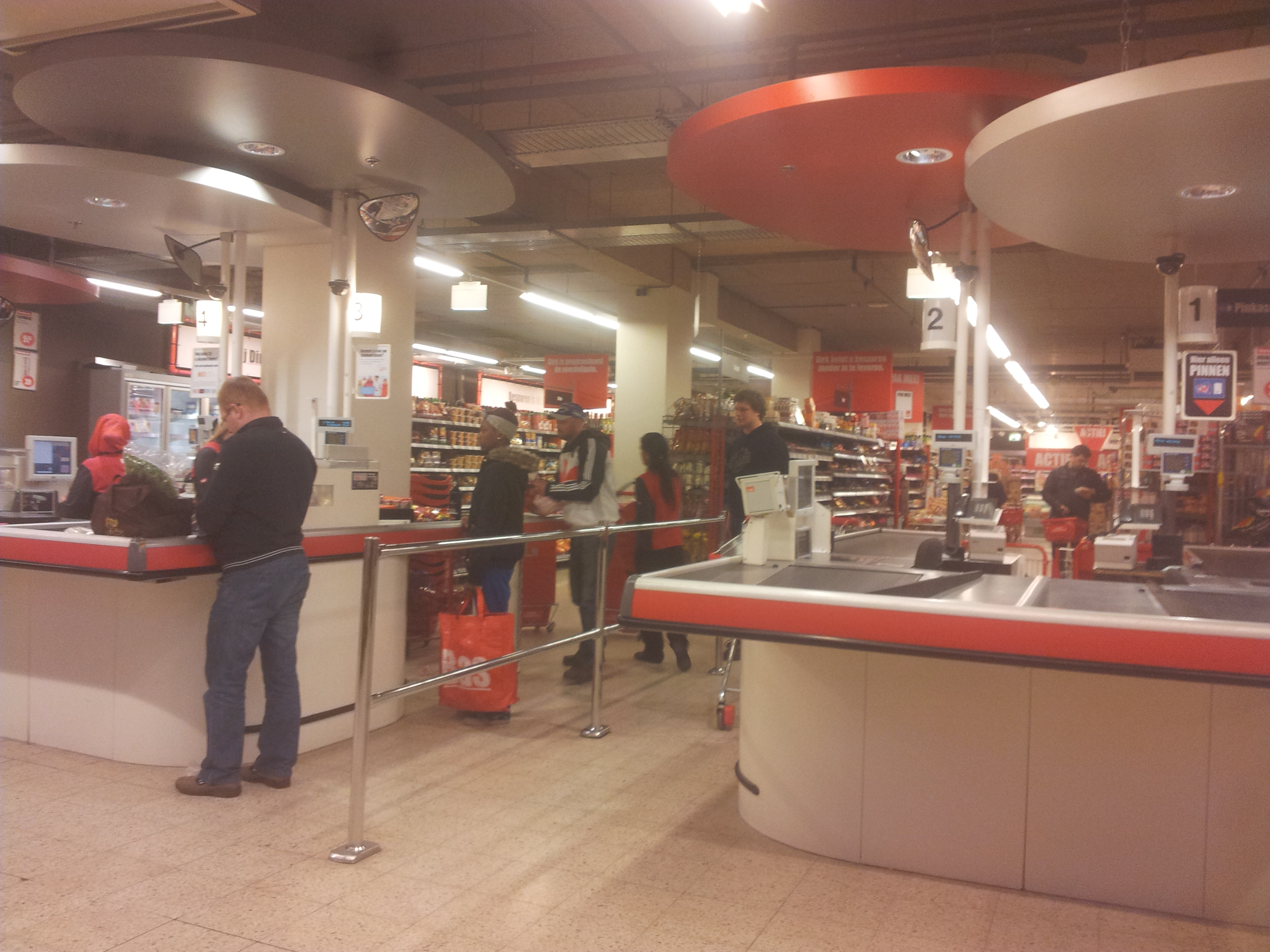
Dirk supermarket in 2015

== History ==
The original business was established in 1942 by Dirk van den Broek (1924–2020) as a milk store in Amsterdam. In 1948 it was converted into a self-service market. The first supermarket was opened in 1953, also in Amsterdam.

In 1972 Dirk started the Digros formule located in Katwijk, in 1973 he bought the supermarkets from Bas van der Heijden which were located around Rotterdam.

In 2009 the company of Dirk van den Broek merged with Dirk Kat's DekaMarkt into the Detailresult Group. From 2014 its brands Dirk van den Broek, Digros and Bas van der Heijden continued as Dirk.
