= AlbChrome =

Albania-based private company

- Company type: Ltd
- Industry: Mineral Industry
- Founded: 1948
- Headquarters: Tirana, Bulqiza; Elbasan, Burrel; Klos, ALB
- Area served: Worldwide
- Products: Chrome, Ferrochrome
- Subsidiaries: Ferrochrome factory of Elbasan; Enrichment Plant of Klos; Mine of Bulqiza; Ferrochrome Plant of Burrel
- Website: albchrome.al

AlbChrome is an Albania-based private company founded in 1948. The company is the largest producer of chrome in the country and among the leading producers of ferrochrome in the world.

== History ==
In 1948, the Communist government of Albania established the state-owned AlbChrome company, which began to mine chromium, a major export for the country.

After the fall of communism in Albania, AlbChrome was reopened in the beginning of 1991. In 2000, facilities such as mines, smelters, plants and factories, part of the chrome industry infrastructure in Albania, were given to a private company from the Government of Albania. The 'DARFO' group worked and exploited these concessionary assets until 2007, when an Austrio-Russian group took over the concession and formed a new company called "Albanian Chrome" (ACR). Under the Austrio-Russian industrial expertise, two out of three furnaces installed in Elbasan Ferrochrome Plant were refurbished and their technology was changed to provide for a higher performance and production. Also Bulqiza Mine experienced a reconstruction of the whole exploitation scheme. Important investments were done for security, exploration and ore processing fields, making the company more efficient.

In 2009, ACR had a change in ownership and DCM (Austrian investing group) took over 100% of the shares of the Concessionary Agreement, becoming the only shareholder of ACR. DCM continued to improve and implement new projects and ideas to further develop the company into a modern European industrial business with high perspective for the future. In 2013, due to difficulties in actualizing investments, DCM sold the whole shares of ACR to Balkan Finance Group.

Today AlbChrome has more than 800 employees in Bulqiza, Elbasan, Tirana, Burrel and Klos and is involved in an intense revitalization. Projects include an enrichment plant is Klos, a well in Bulgiza, and a railway tunnel that connects the two.

== Facilities ==
Bulqiza Mine

The Bulqiza mine is one of the largest and richest sources of chromium in Albania. The mine operates up to 800 metres. About 630 employers Bulqiza mine, part of AlbChrome operates in five levels.

Ferrochrome factory of Elbasan

The Ferrochrome factory in Elbasan started to operate in 1989. It is designed to produce high-carbon ferrochrome using as raw chromium material coming from the mines in the country, mainly from the Bulqiza area. Currently the Ferrochrome factory of Elbasan works with two furnaces. One of the furnaces was recently introduced into production, in early May 2013, after an investment of Balfin Group. Current production capacity is about 33,000 tons of ferrochrome per year. This product is entirely destined for export, mainly to the markets of developed industrial countries in Europe, Asia and America.

FerroChrome Plant of Burrel

Built in 1979, the Burrel FerroChrome plant is one of the first investments in the minerals industry in Albania. The plant is situated 7 kilometers from the town of Burrel and covers an area of 14 hectares. Its main units are the melting unit, electromechanical unit, internal transportation and services units. Chrome mineral that is used in melting power plants, is supplied from the mines of the country, mainly from the chrome-holding basin of Bulqize. The final and only product of the Ferro Chrome factory in Burrel is ferro-chrome with high carbon content (C= 6–8 %), whereas the chrome in ferro-chrome is Cr=60-65 % (base 63%).

== See also ==
- Economy of Albania
