= Balfin Group =

Albanian investment company

BALFIN Group
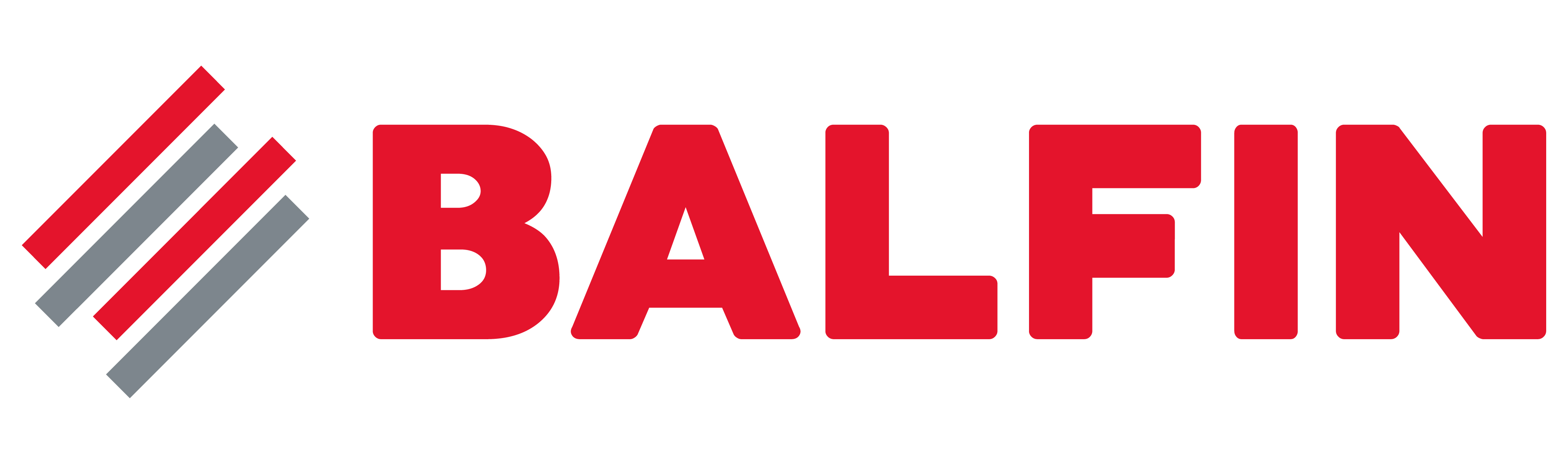
- Logo of BALFIN Group restyled in 2023
- Type: Private
- Industry: Retail, Real Estate, Banking, Asset Management, Renewable Energy, Logistics, Education
- Founded: 1993; 33 years ago
- Founder: Samir Mane
- Headquarters: Tirana, Albania
- Area served: Europe: Albania; Austria; Bosnia and Herzegovina; Kosovo; Montenegro; North Macedonia; Netherlands; Croatia; United States
- Products: Supermarkets; Electronics; Clothing; Shopping Malls; Banking
- Number of employees: 5,000 (2023)
- Website: balfin.al

BALFIN Group (Balkan Finance Investment Group) is an Albanian private investment group founded by Samir Mane in Vienna in 1993. It owns some of the largest companies in Albania. Today the company is present in Austria, Albania, Kosovo, Bosnia and Herzegovina, North Macedonia, Montenegro, Switzerland, Croatia, the Netherlands, and the United States.

BALFIN is a diversified group active in real estate, wholesale and retail, banking, asset management, tourism, education, and logistics. The group employs approximately 5,000 people, and is active across ten countries.

== History ==
BALFIN Investment Group started in 1993 in Vienna, where Samir Mane founded the company Alba-Trade. The group initially traded electronic devices and shortly after established Neptun Electronics which became largest network of electronics stores in Albania before expanding into Kosovo and Macedonia. Neptun was established in 1993 as a retail chain operating in the Albanian consumer electronics market. As of 2025, Neptun operated 94 stores across Albania, Kosovo, North Macedonia, and Bosnia and Herzegovina.

In 2005, Balfin Group built QTU, the first shopping center, revolutionizing the way that Albanians used to shop. In 2011, Balfin Group built a second shopping center TEG, the most modern and biggest shopping center in Albania and the region. In the same year, Jumbo Albania, the largest toy store in the Balkans became part of BALFIN Group.

From 2005 until 2011, several companies were created or became part of BALFIN Group such as: Fashion Group ALBANIA, ACREM, FoodWay, Elektro-Servis.

In 2012, Balfin Group started building Tirana Logistic Park, designed to provide services not only to Albanian businesses, but primarily offering an international standard service. Immediately after starting the construction of this important project, Balfin Group concluded one of the most important investments of the group abroad, Skopje City Mall, which was sold a few years later.

In 2013, Balfin Group acquired 100% the shares of ACR Holding, which is now called AlbChrome. AlbChrome is the leader in the mining and metallurgy industry in Albania, the Balkans and the second largest in Europe.

In 2015, Balfin Group started the construction of Green Coast Resort & Residences, the first premium resort located on Caesar's Beach in Palasa, Albania. The beachfront Resort has finished delivering the villas built in the first and second phase and is now constructing phase 3 and 4 (final) including a 5 star international brand hotel.

Balfin Group started the activity in the field of construction in the early of 2000, first focusing on the construction of residential and commercial areas in Albania. For the latter the group expanded its activity in the construction of commercial and industrial areas, elite and tourism projects not only in Albania, but also in North Macedonia and Austria.

In the same year AgroCon Albania was established, developing its activity in the field of agriculture for the production of agricultural products, wholesale and retail of agricultural products in Albania and abroad. SPAR became part of Balfin in 2016, intending major investment and an expansion of SPAR in Albania. A joint venture established by Milsped and Balfin Group in 2017, Stella Mare, is representative of Maersk Line Company, the largest group of shipping containers in the world, offering its services in Albania.

Balfin Group continued to expand even in 2018 when Skopje East Gate (SEG), which was established in 2017, announced a large investment in North Macedonia, including a shopping center, and several blocks of residential and business complexes.

In 2018, Balfin Group concluded the acquisitions of Dyqan Taxi, the largest online retailer in Albania, NewCo Ferronikeli, the largest exporter of Kosovo and one of the largest producers of nickel in Europe, and Tirana Bank, the first private bank in Albania.

== Subsidiaries ==
- Mane TCI
- Alba-Trade
- Neptun Electronics
- Tirana Bank
- Balfin Real Estate
- Green Coast
- Skopje East Gate
- Jumbo Albania
- Mane Development
- Fashion Group Albania
- TEG - Tirana East Gate
- QTU - Qendra Tregtare Univers
- Tirana Logistic Park
- ACREM
- Balfin Asset Management
