= EMTÉ =

Former Dutch supermarket chain

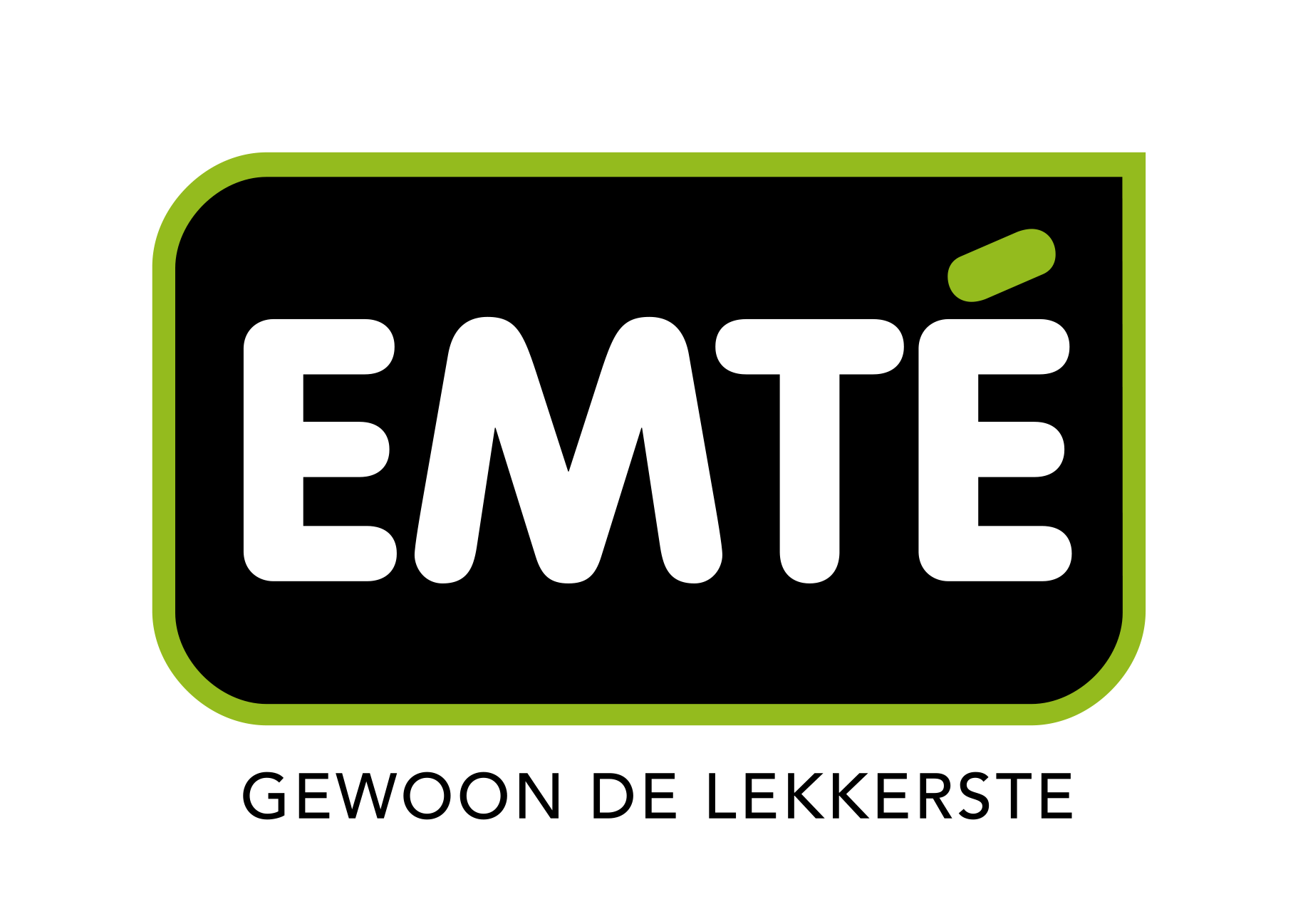
- Founded: 1948
- Founder: Mechie Trommelen
- Defunct: June 1, 2019
- Area served: Netherlands
- Products: Supermarkets
- Owner: Sligro Food Group
- Website: emte.nl

EMTÉ was a supermarket chain in the Netherlands. It was part of Sligro Food Group. EMTÉ was founded in 1948 as a butcher.

== History ==
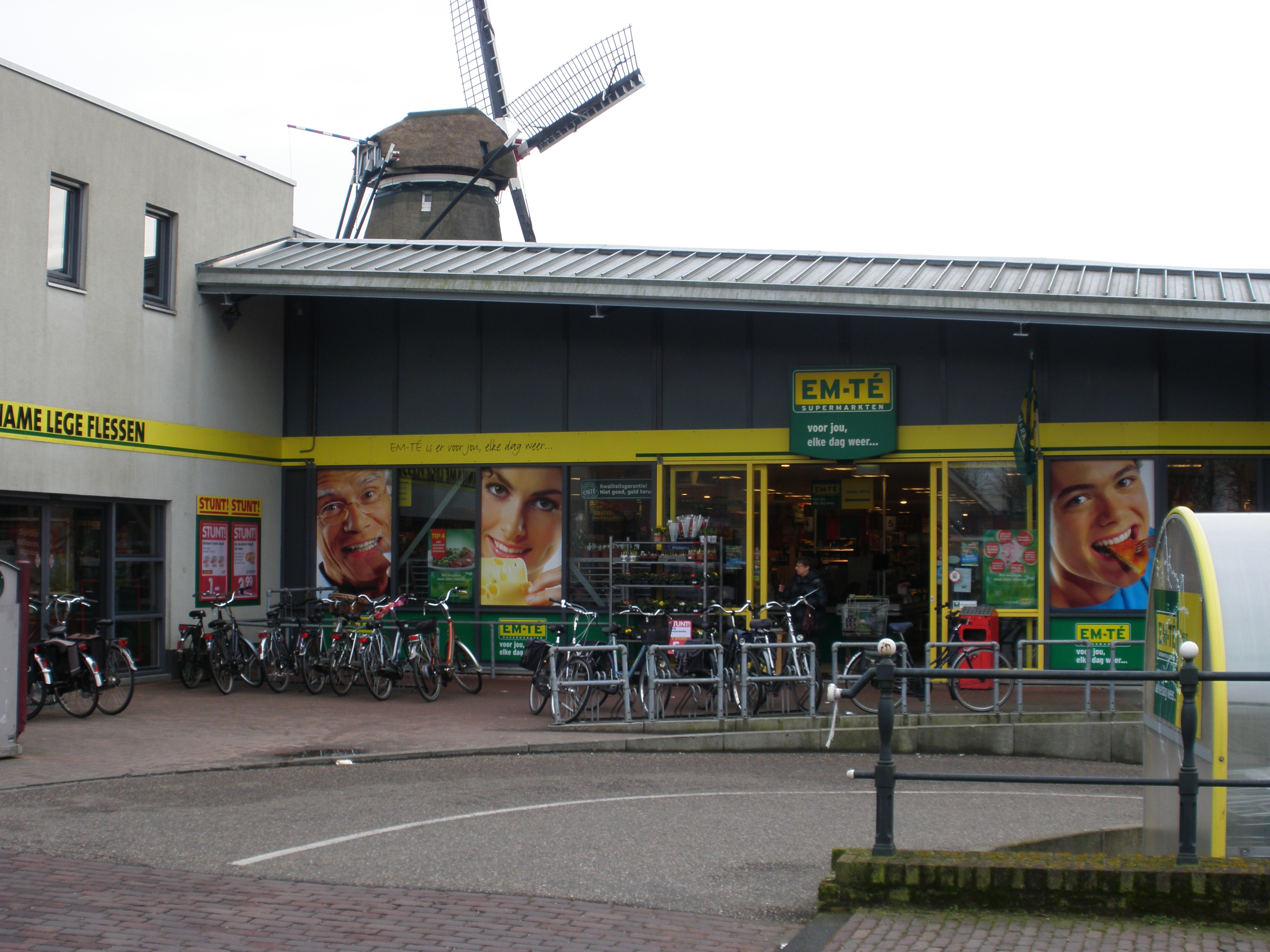
EMTÉ supermarket Montfoort

=== Foundation and initial expansion, 1948–2002 ===
EMTÉ started back in 1948 as a butcher in the city of Waalwijk, Netherlands. When owner Mechie Trommelen was planning to open a second location in the city of Drunen, he was inspired by two already existing companies to open a supermarket. On 2 March 1965, he opened the first EMTÉ supermarket. It was a success so a second store was opened, this time with a liquor store in it. A third store was opened in 1973, a fourth in 1978, a fifth in 1982. This went on until EMTÉ had 12 locations.

=== Sligro and additional expansion, 2002–2018 ===
In 2002, EMTÉ became part of Sligro Food Group. In three years it expanded from 12 to 18 locations. In 2006, EMTÉ, acquired the Edah stores. had 82 locations and was still growing and expanding its locations. After taking over Sanders, Golff, and some Spar locations, the number of EMTÉ locations reached 130.

Under its 3.0 Plan, started 11 November 2015, EMTÉ was to put a kitchen into each store. In this kitchen, EMTÉ would prepare fresh meals, lunches, crudités, fruit salads, and fresh pizzas and nuts. It also expanded the assortment of cheese. The formula started in a store in Dieren.

=== Sold and ceased, 2018–2019 ===
In March 2018, the Sligro Food Group announced that was selling the EMTÉ supermarkets, distributions centres, the meat central, and all operational and commercial departments and activities to a 2018, temporary cooperation between Jumbo and Coop. A number of 79 shops would go to Jumbo and 51 to Coop. This intended takeover was approved by the Netherlands Competition Authority. A precondition was that Jumbo had to sell three shops, in order not to become too dominant position in some locations. The Jumbo branches in Veghel and Reusel and an EMTÉ branch in Eindhoven were sold to Jan Linders (a local supermarket chain) because of that reason. Some of the EMTÉ shops that did not have a future were closed.

The distribution centres in Kapelle and Putten and the meat central in Enschede closed in early 2019. The last branches of EMTÉ closed their doors on 1 June of that same year.
