= City Gross =

Swedish supermarket chain

City Gross is a Swedish supermarket chain specializing in food retail. It was founded in 1993, with its first store located in Hyllinge. In 2024, it was acquired by Axfood for 2 billion SEK. City Gross has approximately 2,800 employees and 42 shops, primarily in the southern parts of Sweden. It had a revenue of 9.1 billion SEK.

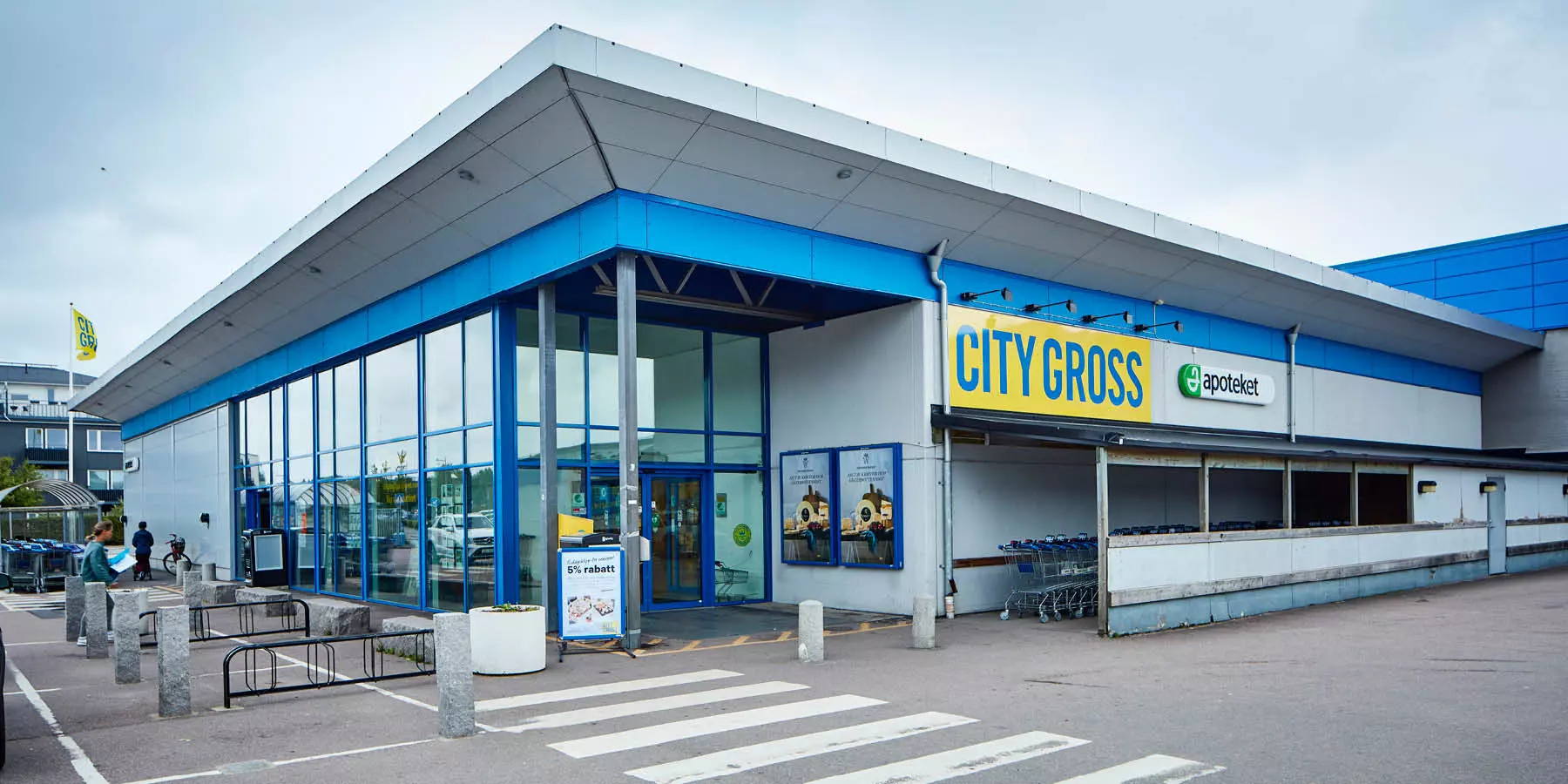
A City Gross in Ytterby, Kungälv Municipality
