= 1973 meat boycott =

Collective economic action in the US

A national boycott of meat took place from 1 to 8 April 1973 in the United States to protest rapidly increasing meat prices.

== Background ==
Meat prices began to rise in late 1972. The consumer price index published by the U.S. Bureau of Labor Statistics attributed this price increase to poor weather conditions, which increased the price for grain and animal feed, rising domestic demand, and unusually high export demand for pork due to the dollar devaluation in mid-February. Meat prices had risen 5.4 percent in a month, poultry and fish 5 percent, all retail food prices 2.4 percent, and that all consumer prices had risen seven-tenths of one percent.

== Boycott ==
The boycott rose out of small, local organizations of consumers across the country as prices for meat rose dramatically. These groups were primarily female led, as women traditionally bought the groceries for their households, and these groups grew both from people that only joined around this issue and already existing women's and community groups.

The boycott included both abstention from buying and cooking meat as well as active protests. The protest was observed by more women than men, as men continued to eat meat that was bought before the boycott took effect.

== Lasting effects ==
According to some, the boycott was successful in lowering meat prices for a short period of time, although The New York Times reported that there was "no significant decline in meat prices". That being said, in the Time magazine cover story for April 9, 1973, the boycott was called, "the most successful boycott by women since Lysistrata," and the public pressure pushed President Nixon to enforce price ceilings on beef, pork and lamb. The leaders supported continued boycotts of meat, specifically by refusing to cook or eat meat on Tuesdays and Thursdays.

Ralph Nader wrote that consumers would become more aware of their ability to advocate for and control food policy. Others wrote that "housewife activism" and women's groups' power gained more recognition, and the boycott's primary lasting effect was as a "consciousness-raising experience".
