= Hemköp =

Swedish supermarket chain owned by Axfood

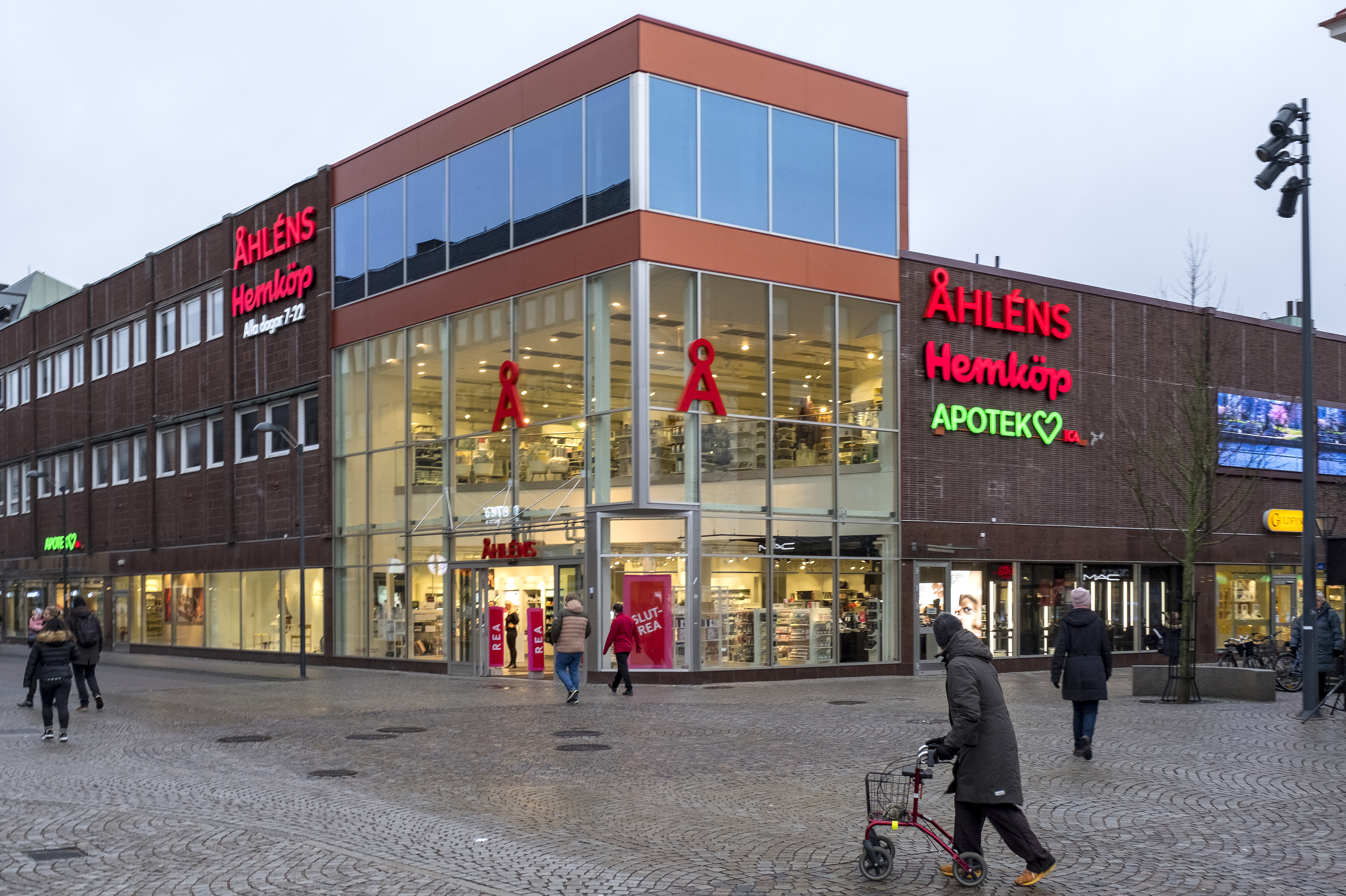
- Hemköp in Halmstad
- Trade name: Axfood
- Industry: Retail
- Founded: Borlänge, Sweden (1958)
- Founder: Olle ”Spik-Olle” Andersson
- Area served: Sweden
- Products: Supermarkets, Convenience stores, Small hypermarkets
- Parent: Axfood

Hemköp is one of Sweden's largest supermarket chains, part of an Axfood-conglomerate that also owns Swedish supermarket chains CityGross, Willy's, Tempo and Handlar'n. In 2024, Hemköp had around 200 stores.

== See also ==
- Axfood
- List of supermarket chains in Sweden
