= Tirana Bank =

Albanian bank based in Tirana

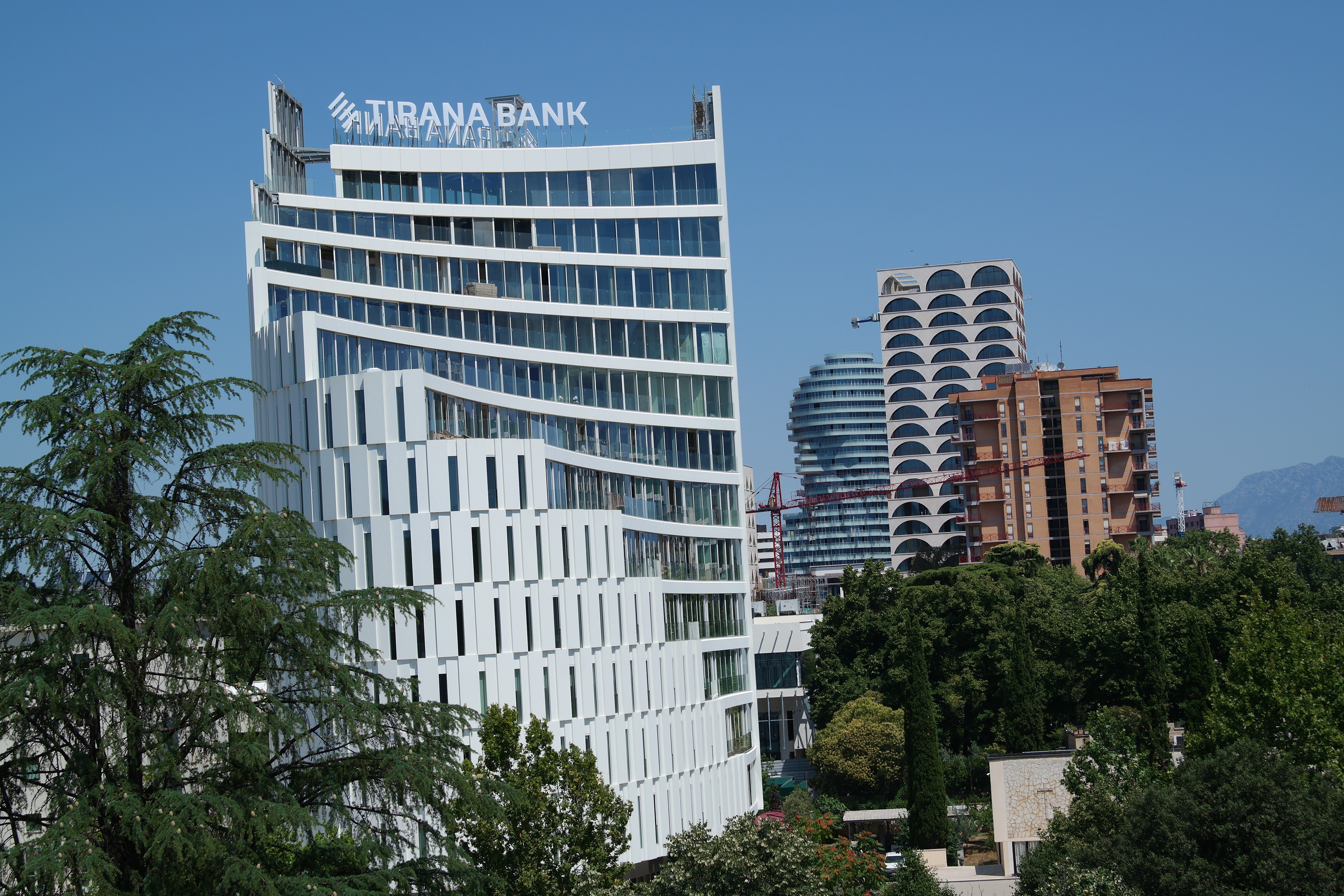
- Type: Bank
- Industry: Financial services
- Founded: 1996
- Headquarters: Tirana, Albania
- Area served: Albania
- Products: Retail, investment and corporate banking, asset management
- Owner: Balfin Sh.p.k
- Website: www.tiranabank.al

Tirana Bank is a bank based in Tirana, Albania. The bank was founded in September 1996 and was the first privately owned bank in Albania. The bank was a subsidiary of Piraeus Bank until August 2018 when the agreement on the sale of Tirana Bank to Balfin Group and Komercijalna Banka was announced.

In 2021, Tirana Bank had a market share of 5.46%, making it the 7th largest bank in Albania.
