= Axfood =

Swedish company

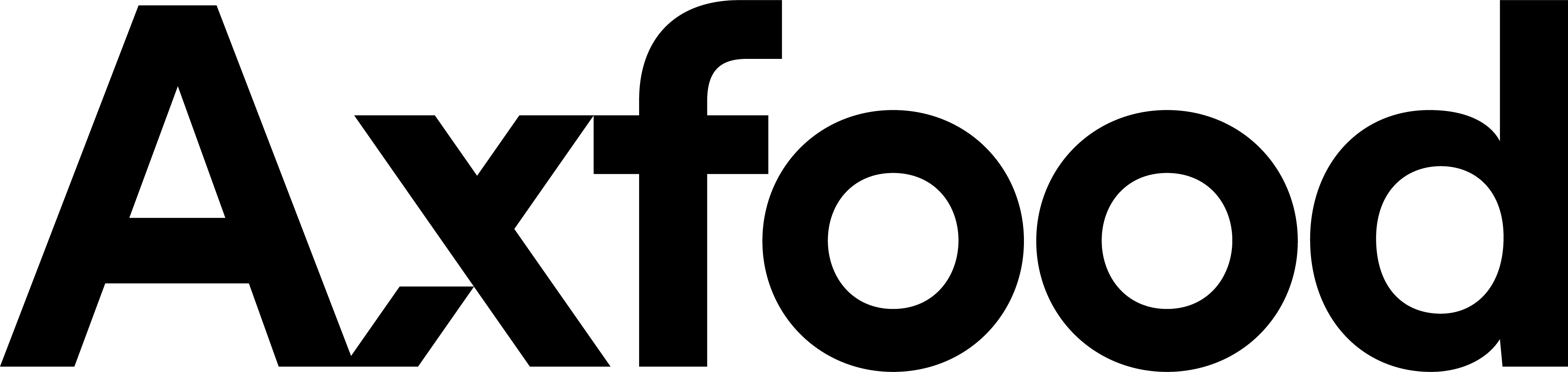

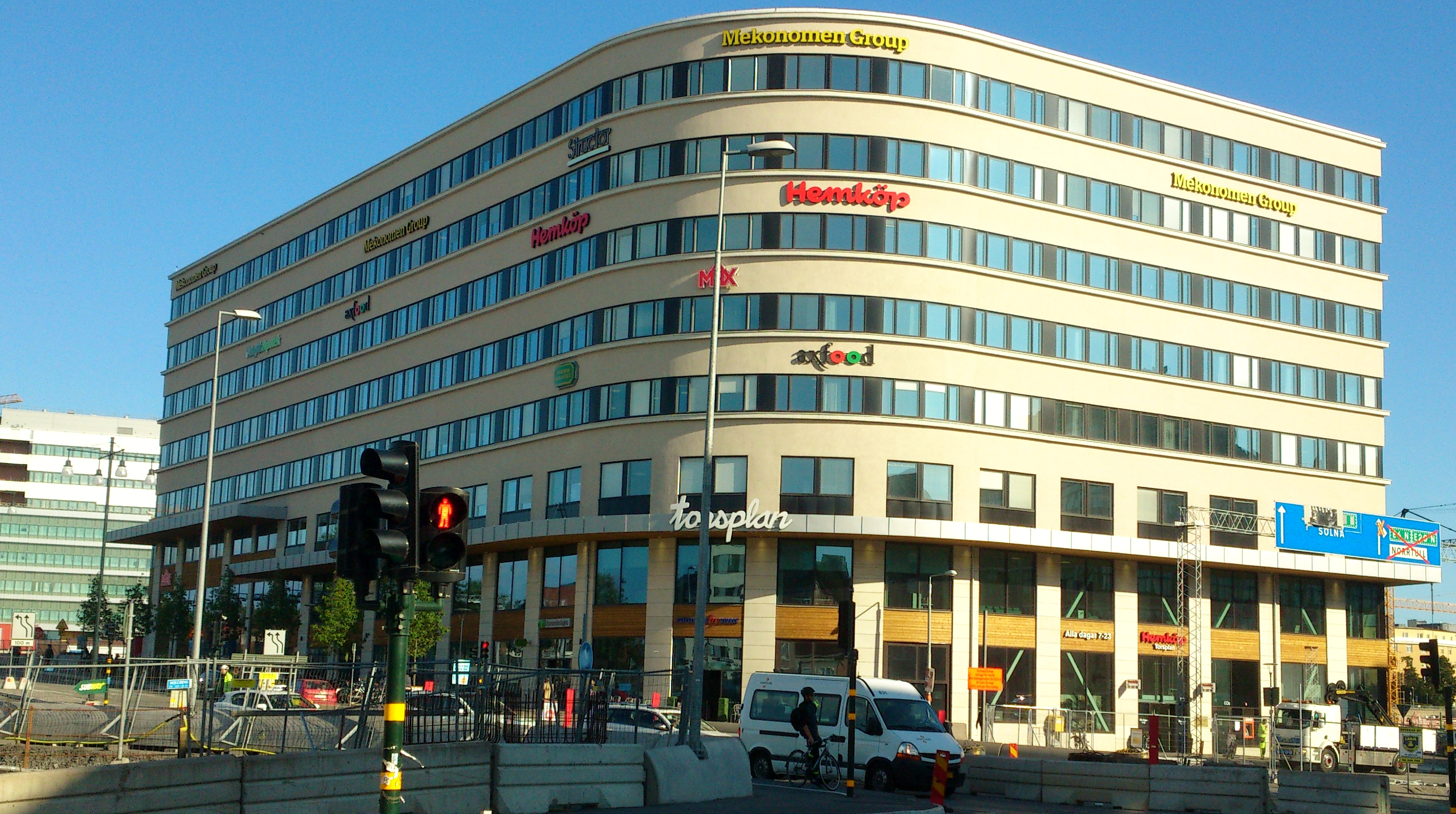
- Headquarters in Stockholm, Sweden
- Company type: Public Aktiebolag
- Traded as: Nasdaq Stockholm: AXFO
- Industry: Retail
- Founded: 2000
- Headquarters: Stockholm, Sweden
- Number of locations: 1,137 stores, of which 274 are Group-owned
- Area served: Sweden
- Key people: Klas Balkow (CEO)
- Revenue: ▲€4.6 billion (2017)
- Owner: Axel Johnson AB (51%)
- Number of employees: 9,903 (2017)
- Website: www.axfood.com

Axfood AB is a Swedish company that operates in Sweden. It was formed in May 2000 through a merger between the Swedish grocery store chains Hemköp, D&D Dagligvaror, Spar Sverige, and Spar Inn Snabbgross.

The Group's retail operations are conducted through the Willys, Hemköp, and Axfood Snabbgross chains, comprising 300 group-owned stores in all. In addition, Axfood collaborates with a large number of proprietor-run stores that are tied to Axfood through agreements. These include stores within the Hemköp chain as well as stores run under the Handlar'n, Direkten and Tempo profiles. In all, Axfood collaborates with some 840 proprietor-run stores.

Wholesale business is conducted via Dagab and Axfood Närlivs. Axfood is listed on Nasdaq OMX Stockholm AB's Large Cap list. Axel Johnson AB is the principal owner with 50.1 percent of the shares.

Axfood's private labels consist of Willys, Hemköp, Axfood Snabbgross, Garant, Eldorado (discount food brand), Såklart (body care, laundry and cleaning), Prime patrol (meat), Minstingen (baby products), Falkenberg Seafood (seafood products) and Fixa (kitchen supplies).

Axfood is a member of the European Marketing Distribution, a European purchasing organization for grocery stores, and United Nordic.

== History ==
- 2017 – Axfood acquired Mat.se and Middagsfrid.
- 2024 – Axfood acquired City gross.

== Market shares and competitors ==
Axfood is Sweden’s second largest food retailer and has a 20% market share in Sweden.

== Sustainability and CSR ==
Axfood's sustainability and CSR work is based on its Code of Conduct. The company has numerous sustainability goals. The six central work areas are sustainable products, climate and energy, employees, transports, responsible suppliers, and corporate social responsibility and influence.

== See also ==
- List of Swedish companies
