= Lundër =

- Village
- Location within Albania
- Coordinates: 41°17′N 19°52′E
- Country: Albania
- County: Tirana
- Municipality: Tirana
- Administrative unit: Farkë
- Time zone: UTC+1 (CET)
  - Summer (DST): UTC+2 (CEST)

Lundër is a village in the former municipality of Farkë in Tirana County, Albania. At the 2015 local government reform it became part of the municipality Tirana.

== History ==
The Vorpsi family settled in this region before moving into mainland Tirana. In the Farkë-Lundër region of the area there is a place called "Zalli i Vorpsve," which adds to the proof of their historic settlement here in Lundër and the Farkë wider region.
