= Big Market =

Albanian supermarket chain

- Type: Supermarket chain
- Industry: Retail
- Founded: 1999; 27 years ago in Tirana, Albania
- Founder: Vullnet Sinaj
- Area served: Albania
- Key people: Ilir Saliaj (President)
- Products: Bakery; Grocery; Deli; Produce; Seafood; Meats; Dairy
- Revenue: $540.1 Million(2025)
- Number of employees: 3,145
- Divisions: 180 in Albania
- Website: bigmarket.al

Big Market is the leading Albanian supermarket chain, with 135 outlets (130 supermarkets and 5 hypermarkets), 20 shareholders and 1500 workers throughout the country. Its slogan is "Big Market, know what to choose".

On 1 December 2018, the company opened a hypermarket called Big Market Citypark.

== See also ==
- List of supermarket chains in Albania
