= Cloaca (disambiguation) =

Cloaca is an anatomical feature of some animals.

Cloaca may also refer to:

- Cloaca (embryology), a structure in mammalian development
- Cloaca (genus), a synonym for Enterobacter, a bacterial genus
- Persistent cloaca, a congenital disorder in humans

== Buildings and structure ==
- Cloaca (Capri), ancient sewage system
- Cloaca Maxima, part of the sewage system in ancient Rome

== Arts and entertainment ==
- Cloaca (art installation), an artwork by Wim Delvoye
- Cloaca (film), a 2003 Dutch film directed by Willem van de Sande Bakhuyzen
- Cloaca Maxima (album), by Finnish rock group CMX
