= Dark Mofo =

Winter festival in Hobart, Tasmania

- Genre: Performing arts, Visual arts
- Frequency: Annually
- Location: Hobart, Tasmania
- Years active: 2013-2019; 2021-2023; 2025-
- Inaugurated: 2013
- Previous event: 11 June 2026 – 22 June 2026
- Next event: June 2027
- Attendance: 427,000 (2023)
- Organiser: Museum of Old and New Art
- Website: Official website

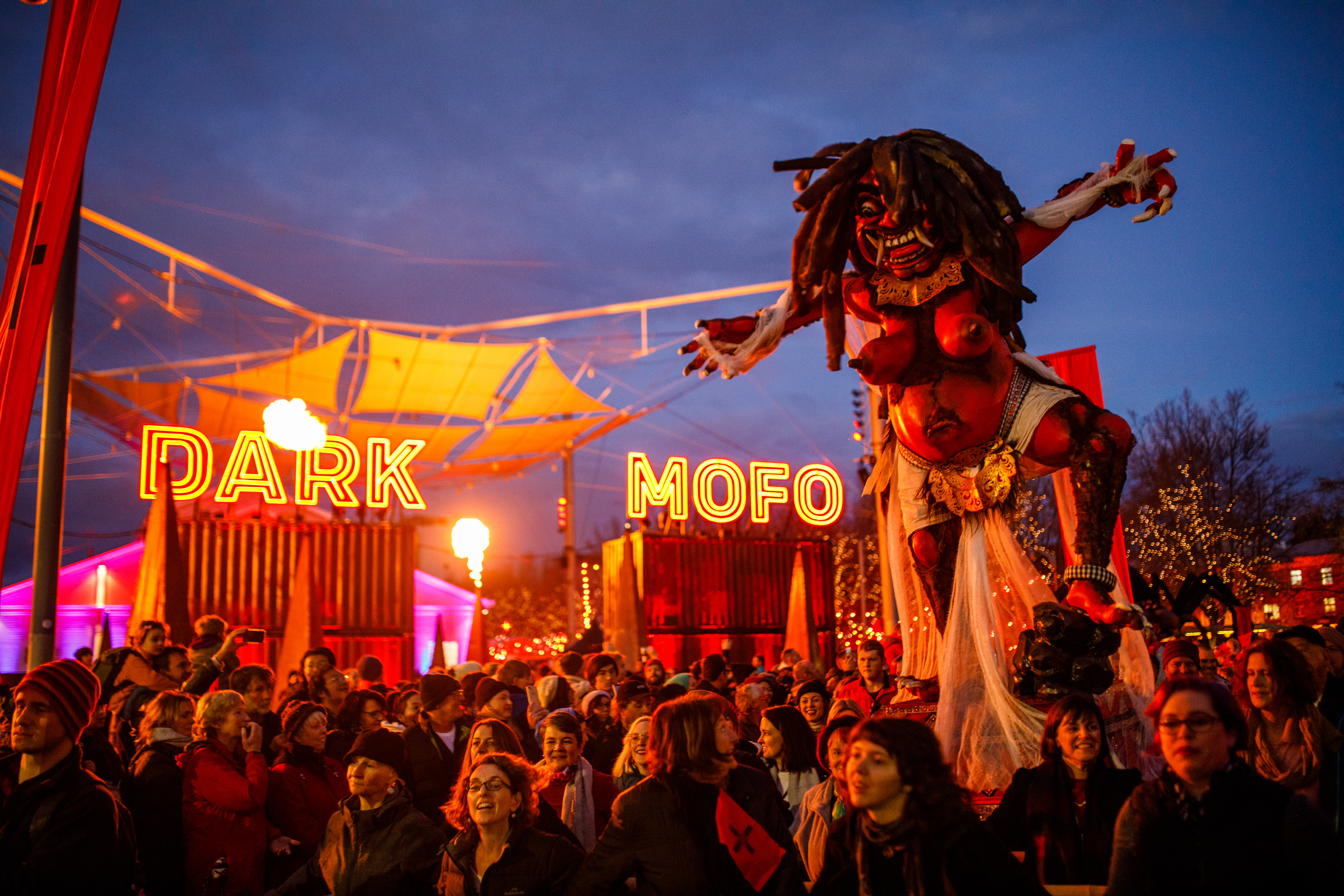
Ogoh Ogoh in front of the Dark Mofo sign at PW1, 2018

Dark Mofo is an annual mid-winter arts and culture festival held by the Museum of Old and New Art (MONA) in Hobart, Tasmania, Australia. Launched in 2013 as the winter counterpart of the summer MONA FOMA festival, Dark Mofo events take place at night and celebrate the darkness of the southern winter solstice, featuring many musical acts, large scale light installations and a winter feast.

== History ==
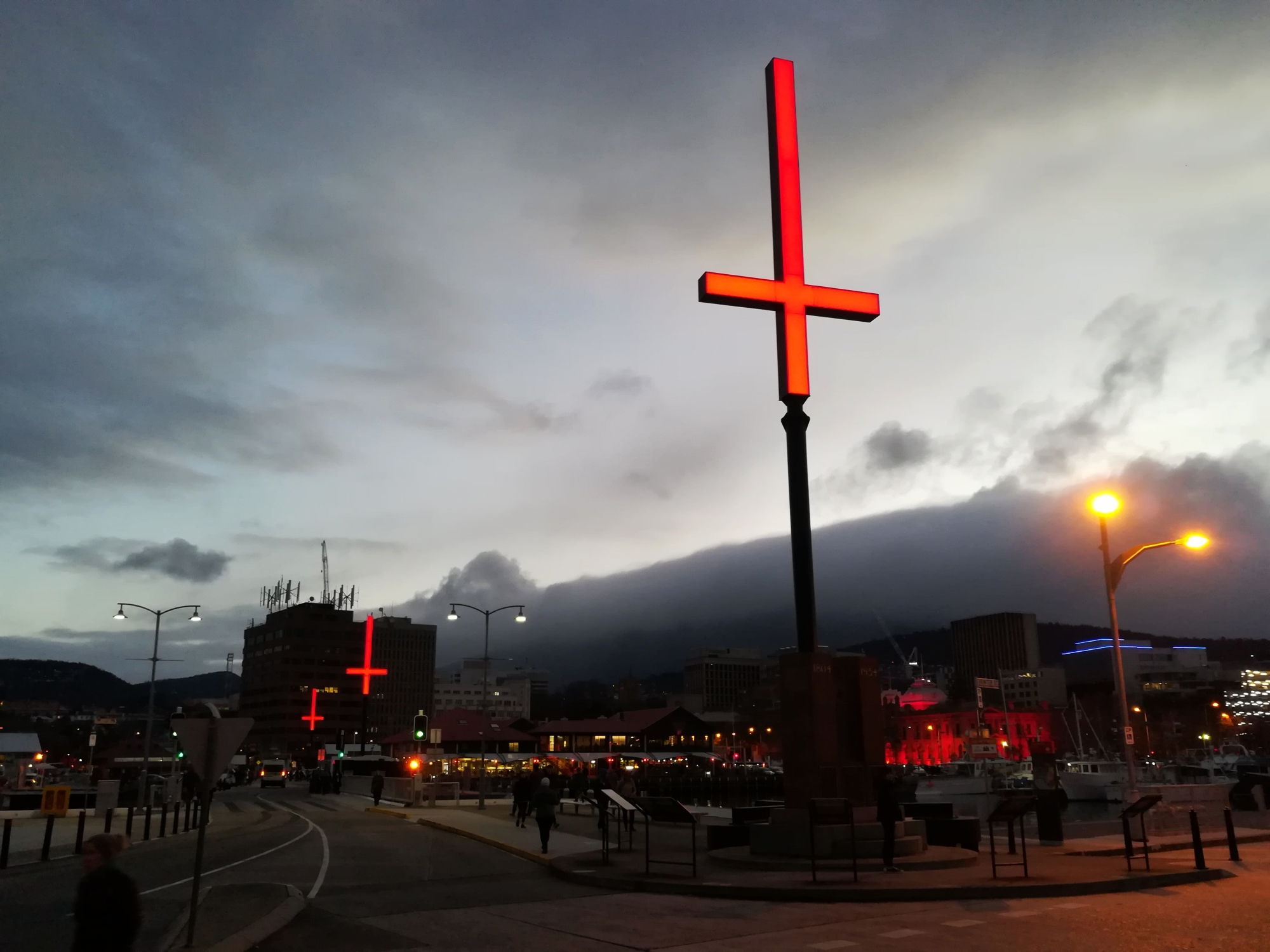
Inverted crosses on display throughout Hobart's city centre during the 2018 Dark Mofo festival

=== Origins and early festivals (2013-2019) ===
Dark Mofo was launched in 2013 by a partnership of MONA owner David Walsh, creative director Leigh Carmichael and musician Brian Ritchie. Carmichael stated that Dark Mofo was conceived as a "marketing exercise" to build MONA visitation during winter months. The festival was supported by the Tasmanian Government, who initially provided $3 million to support the festival over three years. The inaugural festival, held in June 2013, featured Ryoji Ikeda's 15-kilometre-high light installation spectra, now a permanent fixture at MONA. The first year also introduced the now annual nude solstice swim that sees over one thousand people dunk in the River Derwent at dawn on the shortest day of the year. Initially the nude swim was banned by police. However, with the support of politicians and the general public, the event proceeded and Hobart's mayor Damon Thomas took part.

=== Disruption and recovery (2020-) ===
In March 2020, the organisers of Dark Mofo delayed the festival program to 2021 due to the impacts of the COVID-19 pandemic, with Walsh citing the "uncertainty" of the pandemic and Carmichael noting the need to "act decisively to ensure Dark Mofo's long-term survival". The organisers estimated had the event met a last-minute cancellation, the fiscal impact would be $10 million, with most of the costs absorbed by Walsh as the financier, and would have led to the permanent closure of the festival.

The 2021 festival, planned to occur over a compressed one-week period to account for interstate border closures, faced fiscal, organisational and cultural issues. The decision to compress the festival was due to financial constraints from reduced state government and council funding. Financial issues were exacerbated by the decision to limit sponsorship for the event, justified due to its "detrimental effect" on artistic integrity. Following the festival, the Tasmanian Government committed to a further three-year funding arrangement valued at $7.5 million.

In March 2021, organisers faced criticism from Indigenous artists and cultural institutions for inviting First Nations people to participate in the commissioned work Union Flag by Santiago Sierra by donating their blood. The controversy prompted the organisers to apologise and commit to the appointment of a First Nations cultural advisor to develop a cultural advisory group, $60,000 in seed funding to develop works by local Indigenous artists, and improved programming for Indigenous performers. The festival was launched to an opening ceremony organised by the Palawa/Pakana community, including a welcome to country, smoking ceremony and 'Reclamation Walk' through the Hobart CBD. Works included Rainbow Dream Moon Rainbow, a rainbow-themed installation by Japanese-born artist Hiromi Tango.

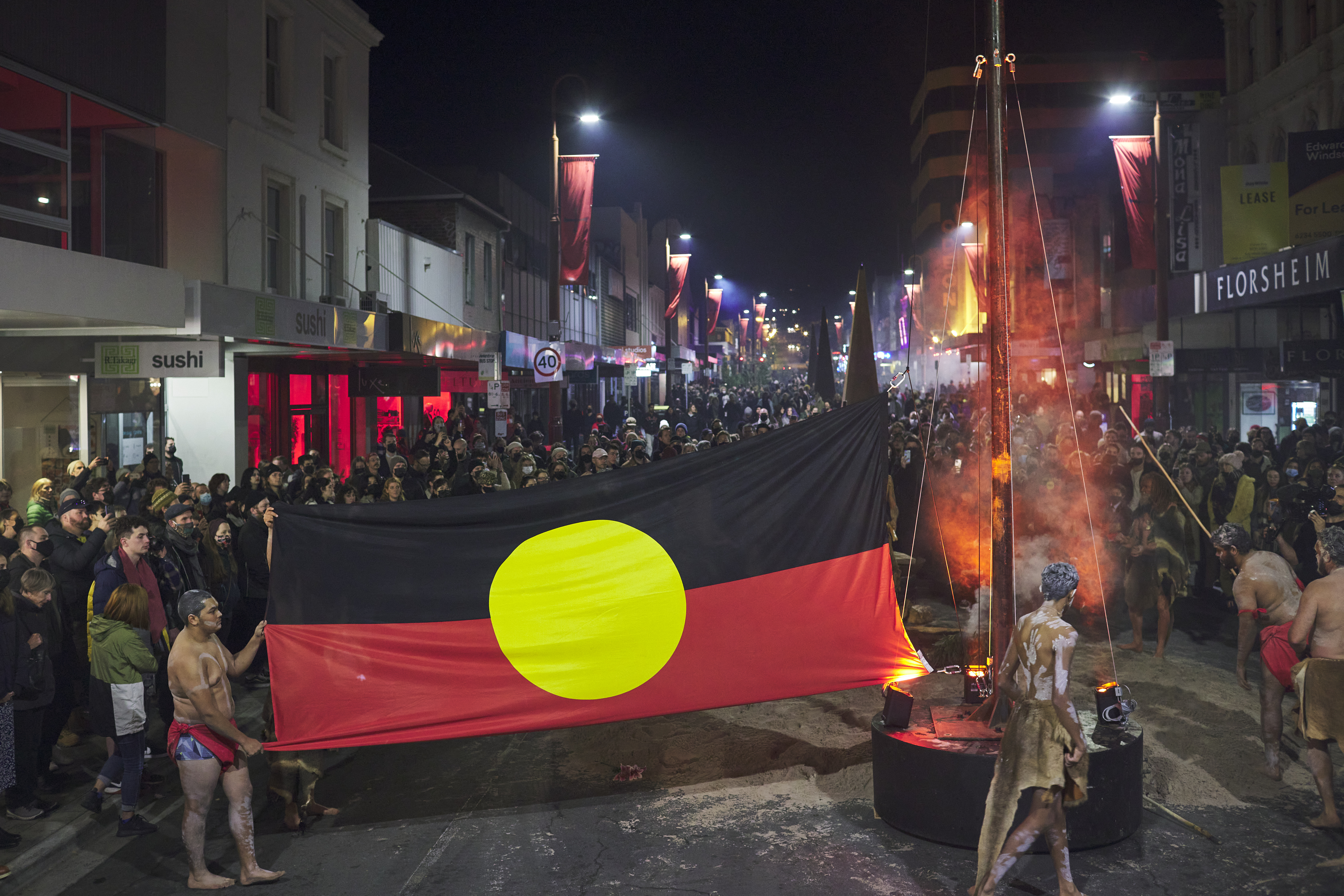
Home State Reclamation Walk, 2021

In 2022, the festival returned to a two-week format. Following the Union Flag controversy of the previous year, the organizers adopted "safer" programming, with Carmichael describing the decision to "pull back (to) give everyone a chance to breathe". The changing tone of the festival was observed by media, with Broadsheet noting "controversy was in short supply", and The Guardian observing the and the program was "less risky" and the events "thinner on the ground". The festival encountered several disruptions, including the withdrawal of scheduled artists such as Deafheaven and Lingua Ignota due to COVID-19, and the cancellation of several events due to the demolition, development, or use of former venues.

In late 2022, Carmichael announced his decision to end his tenure as the creative director of Dark Mofo after 2023, with Sydney Festival and Falls Festival curator Chris Twite appointed as the event's successor. Carmichael cited the need for "new energy and new ideas to move the festival forward", whilst retaining his role as the director of the event's creative agency DarkLab, which managed other cultural projects in Tasmania. Carmichael expressed fatigue with engaging with controversial works, and committed to "giving Chris the space he needs to take (the event) forward in the way he chooses".

The 2023 festival of Dark Mofo was a success, with a record 427,000 total entries to festival events, a 60% increase from the previous year, and a revenue of $5.5 million. Key performances included a live performance of Sleep by British composer Max Richter and the American Contemporary Music Ensemble, in which over 200 attendees slept in cots overnight at the venue. A Divine Comedy by performance artist Florentina Holzinger featured transgressive acts performed by a nude all-female cast of 20, including "masturbation, squirting ejaculation, blood donation (and) synchronised defecation". Trance, led by Chen Tianzhuo, was a "durational performance" held over eighteen two-hour installments across three days, featuring an open-ended a mixture of physical theatre, live performance and rave. The 2023 edition of Dark Mofo attracted 45,000 interstate visitors, sold more than 100,000 tickets and generated more than $5.5 million for the Tasmanian economy.

=== Hiatus (2024) ===
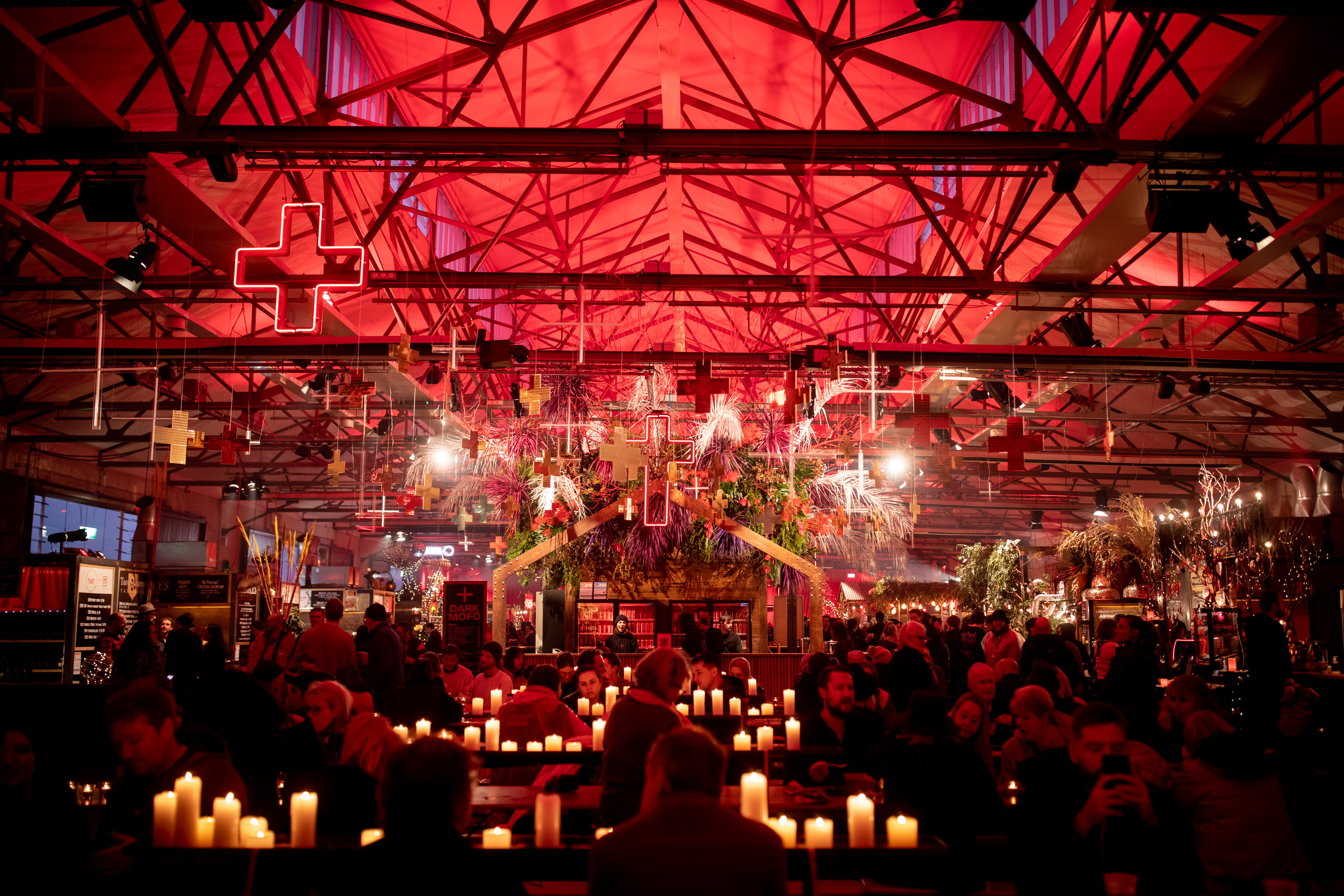
The Winter Feast

In September 2023, Twite announced in a press release that the festival would be delayed to 2025, citing the need for the organizers to take more time to secure a sustainable funding model. Two of the festival's key events, the Winter Feast and Nude Solstice Swim, were expected to occur as planned in 2024 despite the hiatus. The announcement was observed to coincide with several announcements of arts and music festival cancellations amidst rising costs, including the cancellation of the 2023 Falls Festival and This That Festival.

On 12 April 2024, Dark Mofo's organisers revealed that a scaled down edition of the festival which celebrates the community aspects of the event would take place from 13 to 23 June 2024. The scaled-down Dark Moto would showcase local food vendors at the Winter Feast, Namedropping, a new exhibition at the Museum of Old and New Art, the return of the Nude Solstice Swim and its dance programs, late-night parties Night Shift and Slow Burn, and Winter In The Garden.

On 29 April 2024, Dark Mofo's organisers confirmed that the festival would return in 2025.

== Events ==
Year	Dates	Performing artists
2013	June 13–23	A Dead Forest Index, Boris, DZ Deathrays, Martha Wainwright, Mono, The Drones, The Presets and You Am I.
2014	June 12–22	Chrysta Bell, Earth, HTRK, Kirin J Callinan, Mykki Blanco, Sunn O))), Total Control, Veil of Darkness and Yo Gabba Gabba!
2015	June 13–22	Antony and the Johnsons, Gareth Liddiard, Kusum Normoyle, The Body, The Irrepressibles, Pallbearer, and Yamantaka Eye.
2016	June 10–21	Chelsea Wolfe, Itchy-O, Jarboe, Tim Hecker, Marcel Weber, Savages, Tribulation, and ZHU.
2017	June 8–21	A.B. Original, Alessandro Cortini, Einstürzende Neubauten, Gaika, Grouper, Lawrence English, Mogwai, Nai Palm, Thelma Plum, Ulver and Xiu Xiu.
2018	June 13–24	Alice Glass, Autechre, Einstürzende Neubauten, Jagwar Ma, Laurie Anderson, Lydia Lunch, Merzbow, St. Vincent, The Haxan Cloak and Zola Jesus.
2019	June 6–23	Anna Calvi, Augie March, Dirty Three, FKA Twigs, John Grant, Nicolás Jaar, Sampa The Great, serpentwithfeet and Sharon Van Etten.
2020	N/A	N/A
2021	June 16–22	Circuit Des Yeux, Confidence Man, Jeremy Gara, King Stingray, Thurston Moore, Om, Tangents, The Dead C, and Wobbly.
2022	June 8–22	Boris, Cate Le Bon, Kim Gordon, The Kid LAROI, Perfume Genius, and Spiritualized.
2023	June 8–22	Black Flag, Deafheaven, Drab Majesty, Ethel Cain, Plaid, Sleaford Mods, Squarepusher, Thundercat, and Trentemøller.
2024	N/A	N/A
2025	June 5–15 + 21	Baroness, Beth Gibbons, Boy Harsher, Clown Core, Cold Cave, Crime & The City Solution, Divide and Dissolve, Gut Health, The Horrors, Jessica Pratt, Keanu Nelson, Machine Girl, Methyl Ethel, Paula Garcia, The Peep Tempel, Tierra Whack, Under In Between. Thaiboy Digital.
2026	June 11–22	Acid Mothers Temple, Baker Boy, The Black Angels, Chat Pile, Clipping, Daniel Avery, Danny Brown, Dry Cleaning, Folk Bitch Trio, Headache, Iglooghost, Kelly Moran, Miss Kaninna, Ninajirachi, Power Trip, Princess Nokia, Protomartyr, Purity Ring, Sassy 009, Sega Bodega, Snapped Ankles, Tiamat, WU LYF

== Reception ==
Building on the themes of "sex and death" of its parent institution MONA, Dark Mofo has been praised for its unique, subversive, and provocative programming. The Australian noted the festival was "moulded in opposition to the state major arts festivals" and remained "a bastion of radical, uncompromising programming and a home for provocative art". The festival has been praised for its "aesthetic of darkness" in its use of taboo subject matter and pagan iconography, and compared to the Tasmanian Gothic artistic and literary tradition.

=== Awards ===
Dark Mofo has won several awards at the National Live Music Awards, an event recognising and celebrating Australia's live events industry:

Year	Nominee / work	Award	Result	Ref.
2016	Dark Mofo	Best Live Music Festival or Event	Won	
2016	Dark Mofo	Tasmanian Live Event of the Year	Won	
2017	Dark Mofo	Best Live Music Festival or Event	Nominated	
2017	Dark Mofo	Tasmanian Live Event of the Year	Won	
2018	Dark Mofo	Best Live Music Festival or Event	Won	
2018	Dark Mofo	Tasmanian Live Event of the Year	Nominated	
2019	Dark Mofo	Best Live Music Festival or Event	Won	
2019	Dark Mofo	Tasmanian Live Event of the Year	Won	
2023	Dark Mofo	Best Live Music Festival or Event	Won	
2023	Dark Mofo	Best Live Event in Tasmania	Won	

== Controversy ==
The event has courted controversy since its inception, and interstate visitors have noted how different it is to health and safety-obsessed mainland festivals, with one writer calling Dark Mofo "the festival Sydney wouldn't allow." During the inaugural festival, seven people were hospitalised after suffering seizures during Kurt Hentschlager's ZEE, a light installation described as "psychedelic architecture". The exhibit was briefly shut down by the Hobart health authorities. In 2016, a series of artworks were taken down after local art students complained. 2017 saw animal rights activists protest Hermann Nitsch's 150.Action performance piece during which participants writhe in the entrails of a slaughtered bull. The controversy continued in 2018 with petitions from the Australian Christian Lobby and the local Coptic Bishop Anba Suriel calling for the removal of inverted crosses situated around Hobart.

=== Union Flag ===
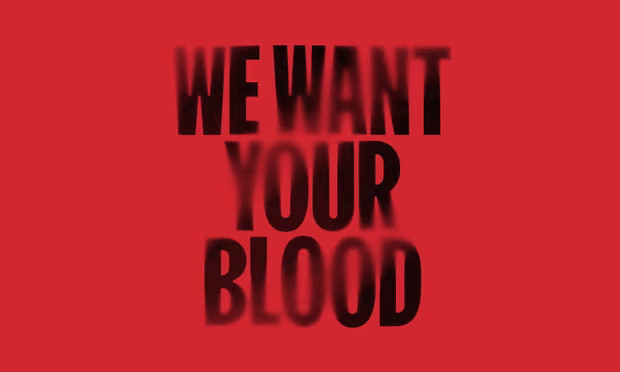
The graphic circulated by Dark Mofo on 20 March 2021 inviting participation in Union Flag

In 2021, festival organisers received criticism for commissioning the work Union Flag by Spanish artist Santiago Sierra. Described by the artist as a work that would "acknowledge (the) pain and destruction colonialism has caused First Nations Peoples", Union Flag was a work in which a British Union Jack flag would be immersed in a bucket of blood donated from First Nations people from countries colonised by Britain and displayed as part of the festival. The decision was subject to internal opposition, with MONA curatorial staff having written to Walsh to condemn the work as "tone-deaf". However, the work's impact was expected to be positive, with Carmichael having described the work's politically "difficult" nature as a characteristic of "good art" and expressed hope the work "will become part of the narrative" of "meaningful change".

On 20 March 2021, supported by the text "We Want Your Blood", Dark Mofo issued an announcement on social media seeking expressions of interest for First Nations people from countries colonised by Britain to donate blood for the project, with one randomly-selected person from each country to be invited to participate. Media outlets expected the work to be controversial from its announcement. Jane Albert of The Australian noted the work was "likely to ignite" controversy. John McDonald of The Sydney Morning Herald supported the work's "negative aspects" of the legacy of colonialism, although he noted it was likely to "draw anger" due to the "emotionally charged" nature of blood as a cultural symbol closely associated with violence.

The announcement of Union Flag prompted strongly negative reactions from Indigenous artists and the arts community. Several Indigenous artists critiqued the work as culturally insensitive and harmful, including Yhonnie Scarce and Neil Morris. Artist James Tylor and writer Jamie Graham-Blair circulated a petition for Indigenous artists to discontinue work with MONA until the institution apologise and engage Indigenous artists and cultural planning, signed by other artists including Tony Albert, Brook Andrew and Kira Puru. Cultural institutions that disavowed the work included the Art Gallery of Western Australia curator Clothilde Bullen, Museums Victoria curator Kimberley Moulton, and the National Association for the Visual Arts. Writing for Overland, Cass Lynch described Union Flag as "disrespectful and ignorant", with the work "perpetuating" the "gore, aesthetics and power dynamics" of imperialism. In contrast, Tasmanian Aboriginal Centre campaign manager Nala Mansell stated they "fully supported" the work as a "great opportunity" to "raise awareness" and "educate people", whilst questioning the appropriateness of calls for donations, stating "there might be other ways of signifying the blood that was spilt".

Organisers involved with the work expressed conflicted responses to the criticism. Characterising the response as a "public lynching", Sierra dismissed the criticism of the work as "superficial and spectacular" on the basis that he had not been given "the capacity to explain and defend" the piece, stating that the Indigenous Australian element was "by no means the central element of the work". Walsh apologised for work's inclusion in the festival, stating he "approved it without much thought" for the "deeper consequences of the proposition", acknowledging the work was not worth staging, not as it was offensive, but as it would not have benefited First Nations people. Ritchie similarly distanced himself from the work, stating he had "nothing to do with this inanity" and dismissing the work as "stupid programming" and "aesthetically null". In an initial defense of "self-expression", Carmichael shared a statement that the organisers "understand, respect and appreciate the many diverse views in relation to this confronting project", and that the festival had been informed by the "range of perspectives" from the Tasmanian Indigenous community prior to announcement. The following day, on 23 March, Carmichael issued an additional announcement that the work would be cancelled, stated that the organisers had "made a mistake and take full responsibility", and apologised "for any hurt that had been caused".

== See also ==
- List of events in Tasmania
