= Cloaca (art installation) =

Art installations by Wim Delvoye, 2000–2010

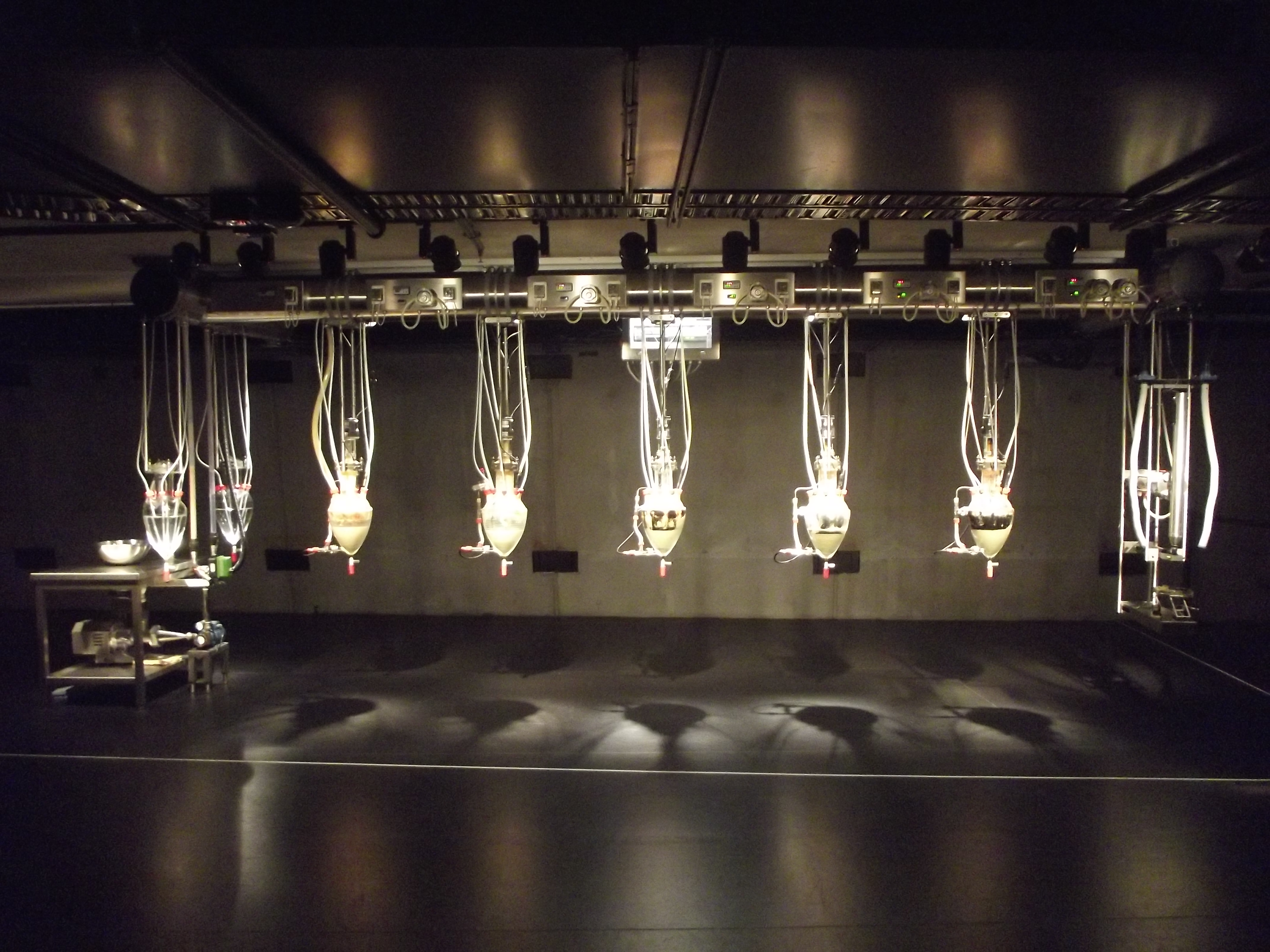
- Cloaca Professional at the Museum of Old and New Art
- Artist: Wim Delvoye
- Year: 2000-2010
- Medium: Installation art
- Website: Cloaca at Wim Delvoye's website

Cloaca is a series of art installations by Belgian artist Wim Delvoye. The installations are computerised machines that recreate the human digestive process. The machine takes in food which it moves through a series of pipes and containers where digestive processes are performed following which the machine excretes the digested material at a time advertised to gallery viewers. This digested material has both the look and smell of faeces. Each installation has its own name, logo and technical drawings.

Delvoye began working on the project in the early 1990s but did not produce a working installation until 2000 at the Museum of Contemporary Art in Antwerp. Since the first installation, Cloaca Original, Delvoye has exhibited a further nine Cloaca installations with the final machine, Cloaca Professional, being exhibited in 2010. With each installation the machinery has become more technologically advanced and efficient. Cloaca deals with ideas surrounding biological processes and commercialism, and the aesthetics of the series draws from laboratories, production lines and consumer products. Cloaca has received both positive and negative reviews from critics. Critics also have discussed whether or not the installations can be considered as performing digestion. The general public frequently has a strong reaction to the installations, yet data gathered by the Museum of Old and New Art demonstrated that Cloaca Professional was the work of art that visitors spent the most time with during their visit to the gallery.

== Background ==
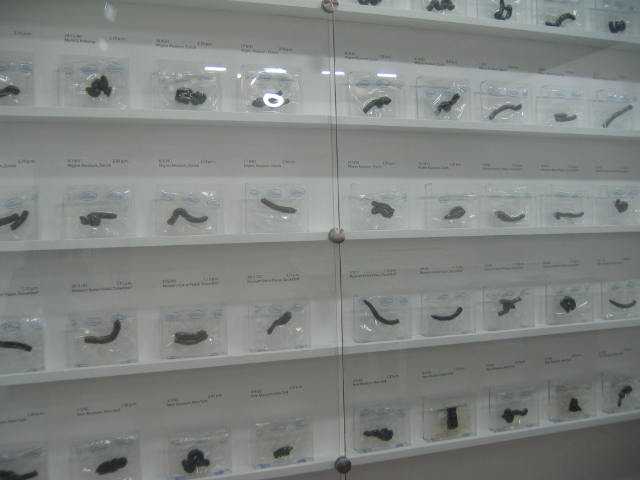
Faeces produced by Cloaca

The Belgian artist Wim Delvoye began working on the Cloaca project in 1992 intending to create installations that reproduced the human digestive process. In an interview, Delvoye said that he has always been "interested in the scatological". Delvoye designed the machine in consultation with scientists from the University of Antwerp. The first working installation was shown in 2000. The title of the series refers to the Roman sewage system of the same name.

== Installations ==
Every Cloaca installation follows the same general model. Food typical of a human diet is fed into a machine by gallery staff or sometimes by famous chefs who cook for the machine as part of the exhibition. The food then passes through a series of tubes and containers. The machine carefully controls the temperature of the environment and incorporates precise amounts of digestive chemicals and enzymes at different stages of the process, eventually producing faeces at an exact time advertised to visitors. The installations give off a powerful smell of faeces. As the series has progressed, the installations have become progressively more efficient and technologically sophisticated. Technical drawings of the installations detail to viewers how the different parts of the machine perform the various biological processes of digestion. For each installation, Delvoye designs a Cloaca logo.

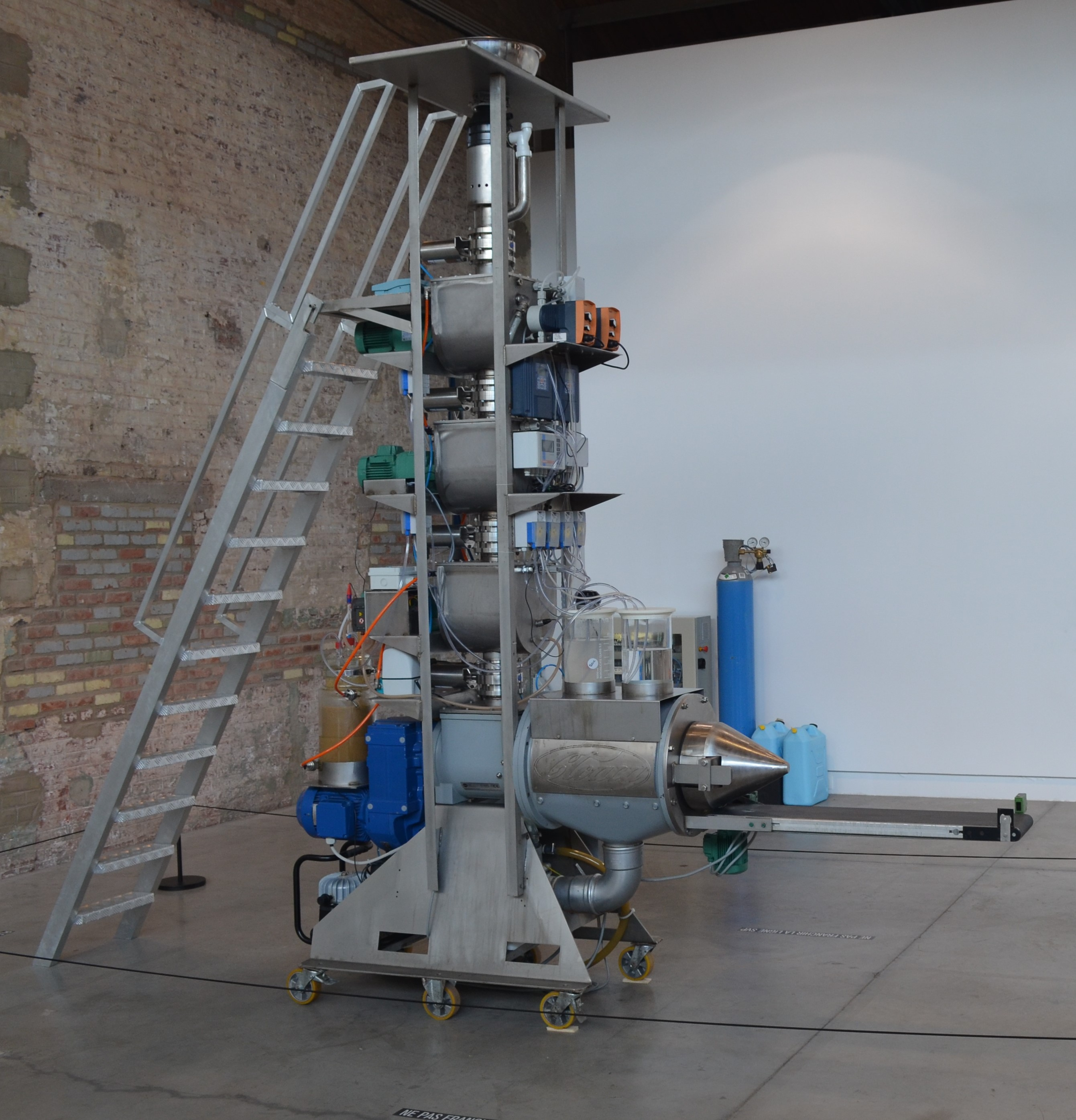
Cloaca N°5 in Charleroi, Belgium

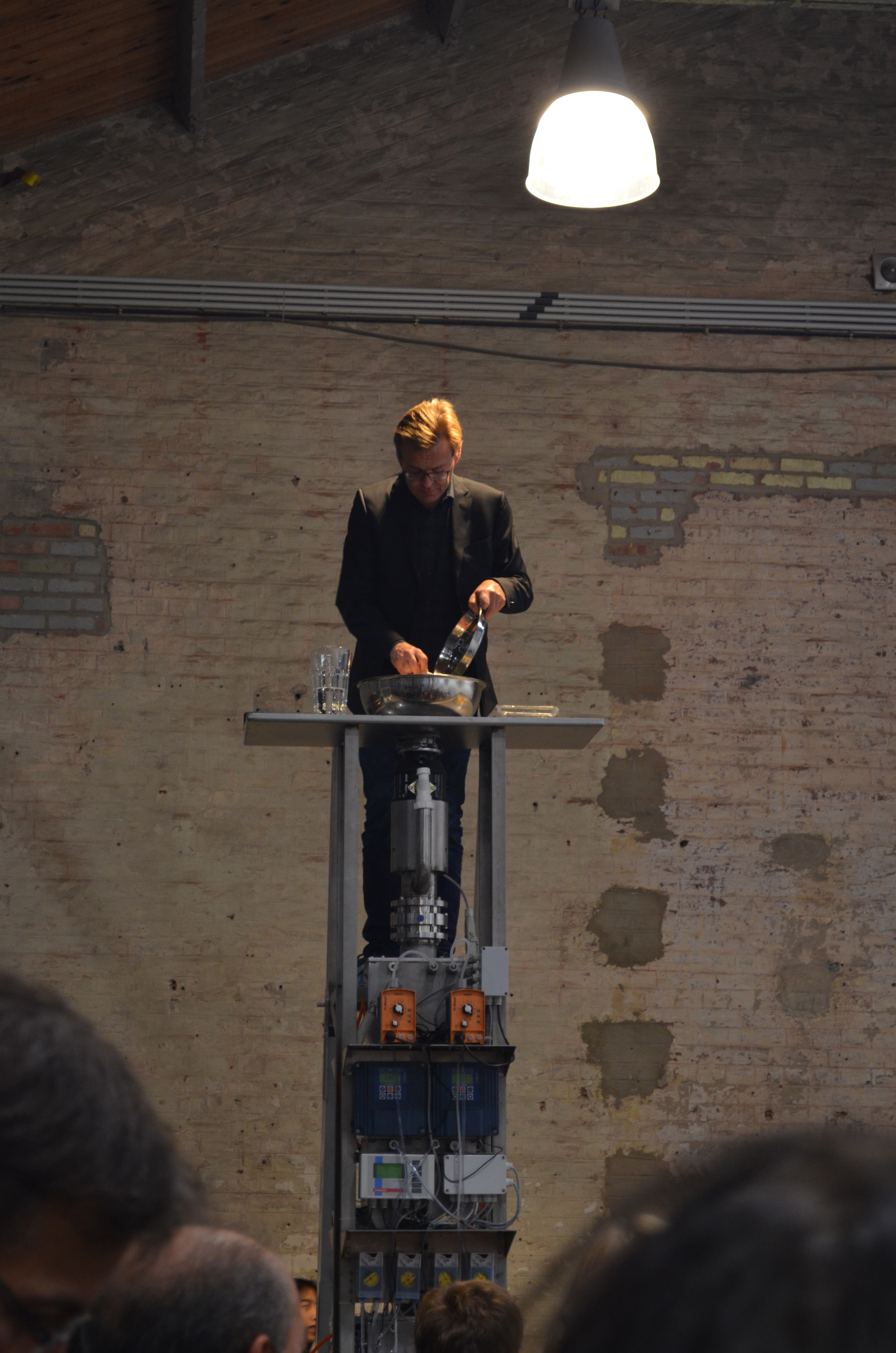
Delvoye feeding Cloaca N°5

| Title | Year | Description |
|---|---|---|
| Cloaca Original | 2000 | The first Cloaca installation, referred to as Cloaca Original, was exhibited in 2000 at the Museum of Contemporary Art in Antwerp. Delvoye described it as a "shit machine". The installation is 10 metres long and comprises a series of six glass containers, sat on top of metal tables, which are connected via plastic tubing.At one end, there is a raised platform from which food is thrown into the first container through a garbage disposal unit, emulating a mouth, twice a day. Through a computer-monitored system, other plastic tubes feed chemicals, enzymes and bacteria into the glass containers to perform the processes of the human digestive system. At the other end, a machine forces out the digested food through a pipe, in the fashion of an anus, forming a sausage-like shape which lands on a spinning piece of metal. The resulting material has both the look and smell of faeces. Cloaca Original produces around 200 to 400 grams of digested material each day. While displayed at the Museum of Contemporary Art in Antwerp, the digested material was displayed preserved in resin inside glass jars alongside information on the food Cloaca had taken in. These glass jars were sold for $1,000 each. The logo for Cloaca Original is a combination of the Coca-Cola and Ford logos. |
| Cloaca New & Improved | 2001 | First exhibited in 2001, Cloaca New & Improved is comparable to Cloaca Original but has a more refined aesthetic, featuring a modernized, industrial design. Untidy components from Cloaca Original, such as lose tubing and wires, are concealed within square-shaped, stainless steel cases which obscure some of the workings of the process. The installation produces around the same amount of digested material each day as its predecessor. Cloaca New & Improved's logo is similar to Cloaca Original with the introduction of the Mr. Clean character, a muscular and bald figure with exposed intestines that resembles a figure one might see on domestic cleaning merchandise. |
| Cloaca Turbo | 2002 | Cloaca Turbo was created in 2002 and is smaller than the previous two installations at around eight metres long. The installation does not feature the glass containers used by its predecessors and instead uses three units that resemble industrial washing machines. Cloaca Turbo has a logo which mimics that of Harley Davidson. |
| Cloaca Quattro | 2004 | Cloaca Quattro was completed in 2004. It continues the trend of the Cloaca installations becoming more industrial and utilitarian. The Cloaca Quattro was the first in the series to follow a vertical process. The logo again features Mr. Clean this time flexing his muscles in a manner similar to Popeye. |
| Cloaca N°5 | 2005 | Cloaca N°5, first exhibited in 2005, is incongruously named after the perfume Chanel N°5, which the logo also imitates.It operates vertically like Cloaca Quattro. |
| Personal Cloaca | 2007 | The 2007 installation, Personal Cloaca, is significantly smaller than its predecessors and looks almost identical to a domestic washing machine. The logo is in the style of the Durex logo. |
| Super Cloaca | 2007 | Super Cloaca was the largest installation in the series when it was exhibited in 2007. The installation, which is around 15 metres long, has the appearance of a freight train car on a piece of track. It consumes around 300 kilograms of food a day, roughly equivalent to the daily consumption of 250 people, and produces around the same weight of faeces. The logo for Super Cloaca references Superman's logo. |
| Mini Cloaca | 2007 | In the same year as Super Cloaca, which was the largest Cloaca installation to date, Delvoye exhibited the smallest installation named Mini Cloaca. The installation usually sits on a table and has a similar scientific aesthetic to Cloaca Original. The installation can digest one small meal at a time. The logo is modelled on the stickers found on Chiquita bananas and features Mr. Clean. |
| Cloaca Travel Kit | 2010 | Following the completion of Mini Cloaca, Delvoye considered the series completed. Despite this, in 2010 he continued with the series by creating Cloaca Travel Kit. The installation is displayed inside a small metal briefcase. |
| Cloaca Professional | 2010 | Cloaca Professional was commissioned by David Walsh for his Museum of Old and New Art (MONA) and was unveiled in 2010. Prior to meeting Walsh, Delvoye had no intention of selling any Cloaca installations to museums. Gallery visitors can watch the machine being fed twice a day. Cloaca Professional was screened for bowel cancer in 2017 as part of efforts to promote uptake of the Australian government's National Bowel Cancer Screening Program. |

== Themes ==
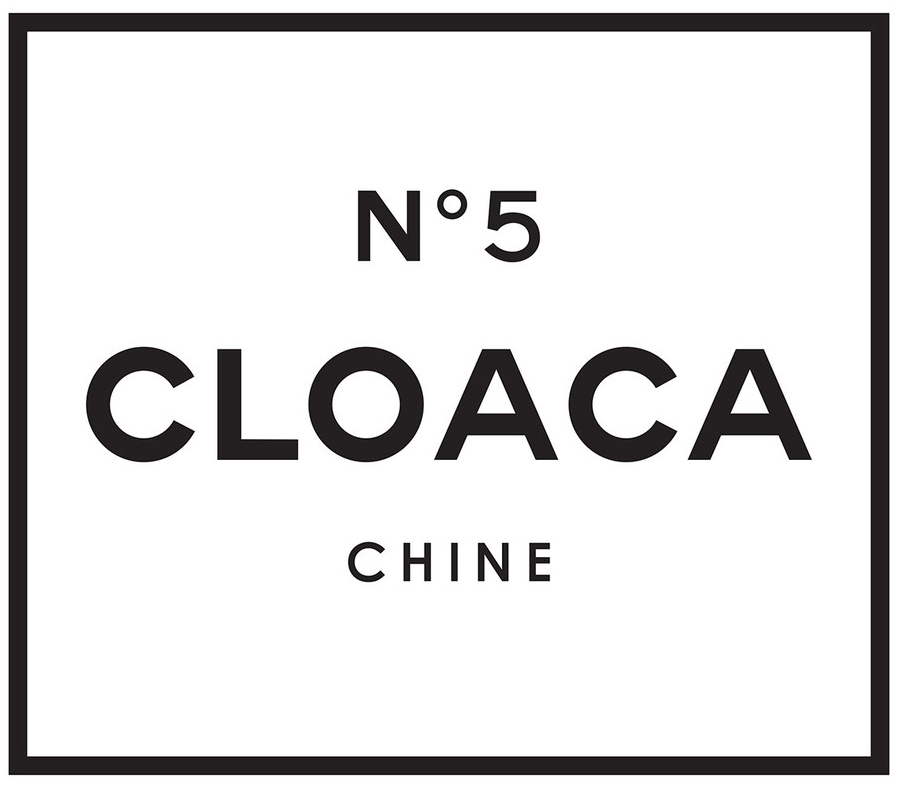
Cloaca N°5 logo

The Cloaca series deal with themes surrounding both biological processes and commercialisation. Aesthetically, the installations combine elements of laboratories, production lines and consumerism. The series explores anthropomorphism, mechanomorphism and posthumanism with Delvoye describing the installation as a "human being without a soul". The series is an absurd demonstration of the ability of machines to reproduce human functions. Delvoye's use of logos and promotional names for each installation, as well as the fast development of new installations to cater to different consumer groups, such as personal machines and commercial scale machines, demonstrates an interest in human desire and culture and their relationship to faeces.

== Reception ==
=== Critical reception ===
When a Cloaca installation was exhibited in New York in 2002, it received a negative reaction. A critic reviewing the exhibition in The Brooklyn Rail was "disgusted" by the installation and criticised its cost, reliance on gimmicks and attempt at being an "educational enterprise". The review negatively contrasted Cloaca to other work on faeces by Pier Paolo Pasolini, Luis Buñuel, Karen Finley, Peter Saul and Joseph Beuys. Reviewing the same exhibition, The New York Times called the Cloaca "brainiac Conceptual Art, top-heavy with ideas", and argued that its effectiveness lies in being operational rather than just existing as a thought experiment. Writing in Frieze about Cloaca New & Improved, critic Saul Anton described the installation as "a metaphor for our culture, as art, as economics and so on - and arguably one of the most spectacular in decades."

Critics Christian Denker and Isabelle Loring Wallace have discussed whether the installations' work can be identified as digestion. Denker described the work as a "simulation" and "imitation" of the biological digestive process that omits the provision of nourishment and energy which is the primary reason for digestion. Wallace commented that what the installations demonstrate, at a great cost, is not the digestive process but rather "digestion's facsimile, not shit, but shit's representation."

=== Public reception ===
Jennifer Friedlander commented that Cloaca generates a "surprisingly disturbing effect among viewers." In his review of Cloaca Original, Els Fiers wrote that gallery visitors had a "a strange look on their faces, as if they'd just paid a visit to the devil" after viewing the exhibition, and also described a school girl who began crying when looking at the installation. A survey at MONA has shown that Cloaca Professional is visitors' most hated artwork at the museum, yet the museum's iPod tracking devices show that it is the artwork visitors spend the most time with.

== See also ==
- Artist's Shit
- Digesting Duck
