= Snake (Nolan) =

Painting by Sidney Nolan

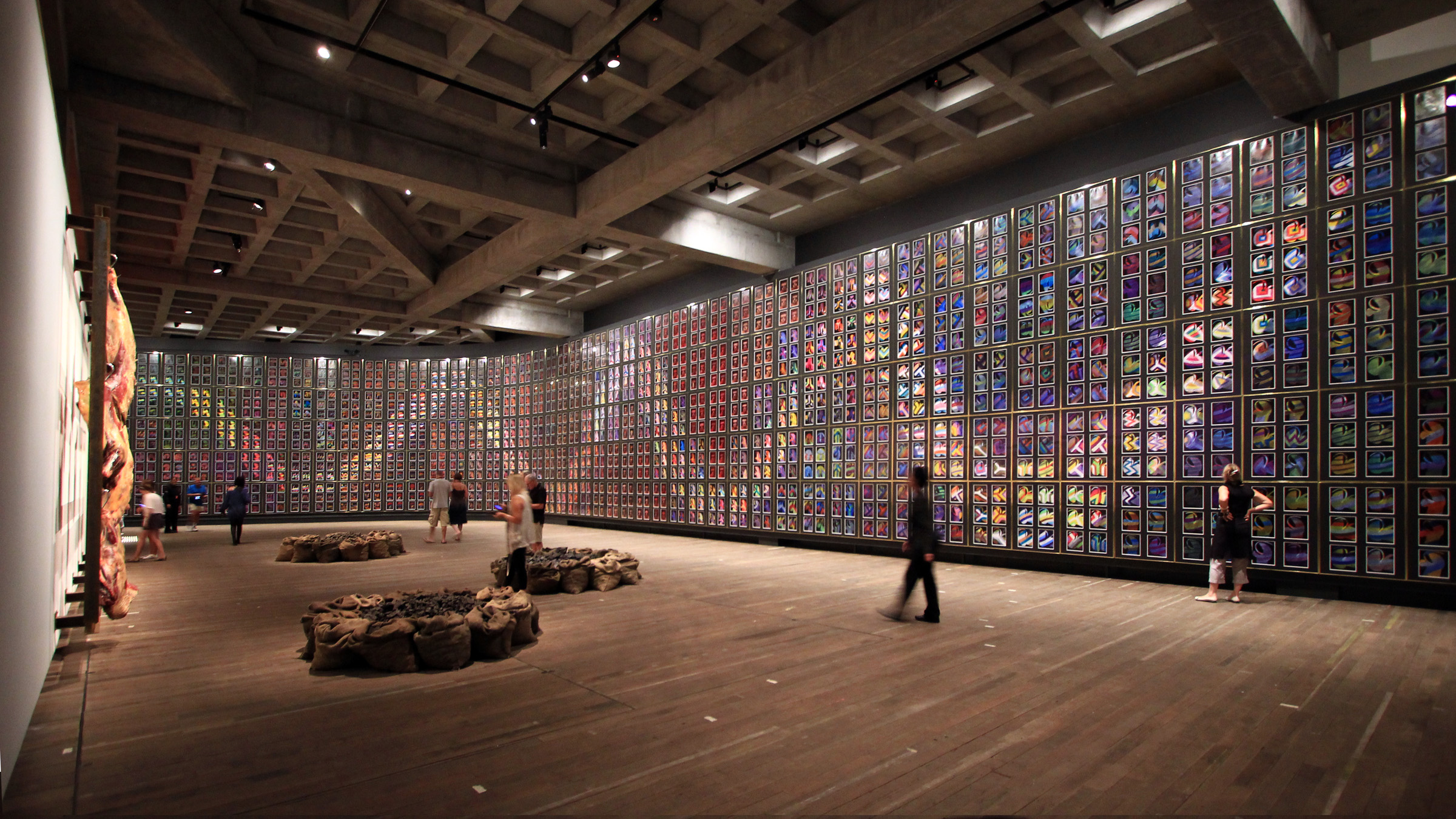
- Artist: Sidney Nolan
- Year: 1970–72
- Medium: Ink, dye, and wax crayon on card
- Dimensions: 9.14 m × 45.72 m (30.0 ft × 150.0 ft)
- Location: Museum of Old and New Art, Hobart, Tasmania, Australia

Snake is an artwork by Australian artist Sir Sidney Nolan. Created between 1970 and 1972, it consists of 1,620 panels arranged so that the images on each panel form a larger image of a snake. It is part of the collection of the Museum of Old and New Art (MONA) in Hobart, Australia.

Nolan is believed to have created the work after "he saw a mural in a Beijing palace that moved him to create an Australian version, inspired by the desert in springtime"

Nolan developed a gestural language for Snake in the same way that most artists work. He composed and executed a little picture, influenced, as we all know, by aboriginals and their art, and New Guineans, and their snake dances. He then painted similar scenes with a quicker hand and fewer gestures, and he repeated this thousands of times, till the paintings were made by muscle memory.

— David Walsh,

David Walsh, MONA's owner, purchased the work in 2005 for AUD$2m. Walsh modified his initial design for MONA to make space for the work. Before its installation there, Snake was shown in England and Ireland.
