= Stephen Shanabrook =

American conceptual artist (born 1965)

Stephen J. Shanabrook (born 1965 in Cleveland, United States) is an American conceptual artist, who lives and works in New York City and Moscow, Russia. He graduated from Syracuse University, The Skowhegan School of Art program, USA and de Ateliers, The Netherlands.

== Concept and Work ==
Shanabrook began making special kinds of chocolate pralinés from casts of wounds on dead bodies from morgues in Russia and North America in 1995. Son of an obstetrician and the town coroner, as a child Shanabrook worked at a chocolate factory in a small town in Ohio. Overlapping these oppositional influences the artist created a unique vision of beauty, one on the threshold of death, pain and disaster. Shanabrook gives a new and often disturbing meaning to substances and forms otherwise associated with comfort, happiness and banality. One late 2000s chocolate piece was a life size sculpture of the remnants of an 18-year-old suicide bomber, based on a press photograph.

Shanabrook's works are included the collection of David Walsh, in his Museum of Old and New Art (MONA) in Tasmania, Australia.

== Collaborations ==
Fashion label Comme des Garçons used images of the "Paper Surgery" project by Shanabrook and Veronika Georgieva for their ad campaign Spring/Summer 2010. Shanabrook worked with Veronika Georgieva and the Saatchi and Saatchi advertising agency to create an ad campaign for 25th anniversary of Reporters Without Borders in 2010.
