= Studium and punctum =

Pair of concepts in aesthetics

Studium and punctum are a pair of concepts introduced by the French literary theorist Roland Barthes in his 1980 book Camera Lucida (La chambre claire), the last work he published before his death. Barthes uses the two Latin words, studium and punctum, to describe two ways a viewer responds to a photograph. The studium is the shared, recognisable meaning a photograph presents, the interest a viewer takes in an image through common knowledge. The punctum is a sharp, personal detail that pierces or wounds the viewer, cutting through the studium to produce an intense effect.

== Concepts ==
The studium is the familiar knowledge through which a photographs becomes recognisable, described by Barthes as a matter of liking rather than loving, and as an interest which engages the viewer without "wounding" them. According to Barthes, a photograph which only contains studium may please or displease, but it does not disturb. Barthes calls these images "unary".

The punctum, by contrast, is a detail that seems to "pierce" or "wound" the viewer and is both not chosen by the viewer and often not intended by the photographer while resisting description. Later in the book Barthes also identifies a second aspect of the punctum citing time itself pointing to the sense that the subject "has been" and is now past.

== Influence ==
The distinction has become a widely cited concept in photography criticism and has been taken up across a range of humanities disciplines. In psychoanalysis, Dana Amir has applied the terms to clinical case writing, while Jennifer Friedlander has read the punctum through the theory of Jacques Lacan. The concepts have also been extended to architecture, to theatre and performance studies, to film and video art, and to the philosophy of memory.

== See also ==
- Roland Barthes
- Camera Lucida
- Semiotics
- The Death of the Author

== Bibliography ==
- Barthes, Roland (1981). Camera Lucida: Reflections on Photography. Translated by Howard, Richard. New York: Hill and Wang. ISBN 978-0-374-53233-8 – via Internet Archive.
