= Museum of Old and New Art =

Art museum in Hobart, Tasmania, Australia

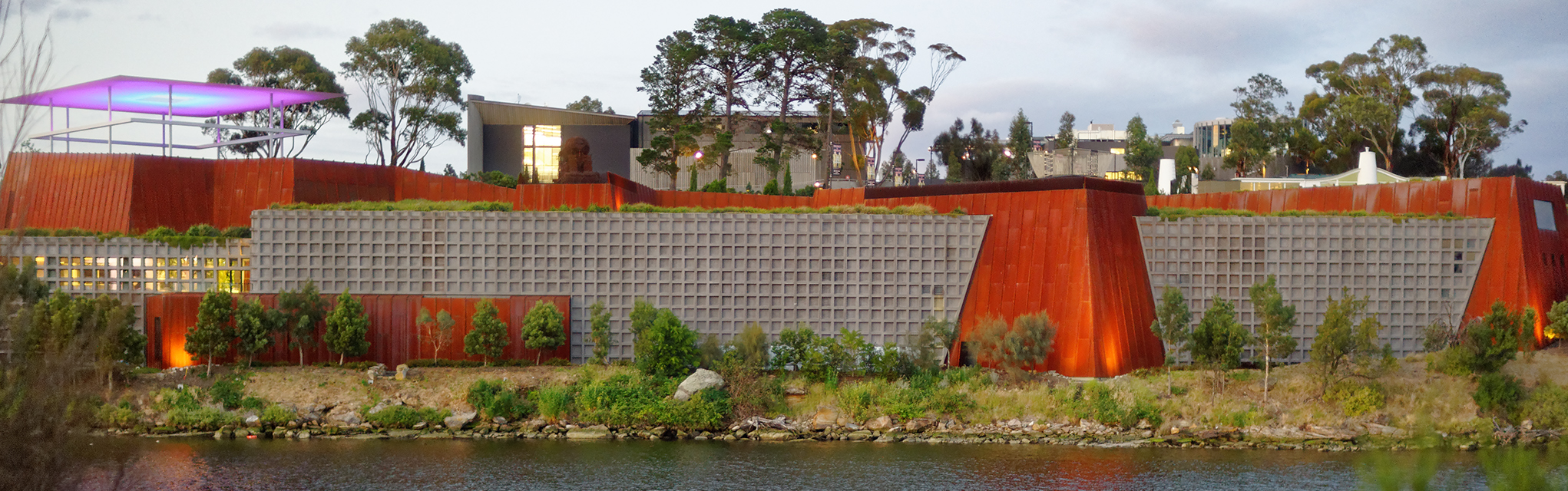
- MONA, 2015

- Location within Tasmania
- Former name: Moorilla Museum of Antiquities
- Established: 2011
- Location: Hobart, Tasmania, Australia
- Coordinates: 42°48′46″S 147°15′40″E
- Type: contemporary art; modern art; ancient art
- Key holdings: Cloaca Professional; The Holy Virgin Mary; On the road to heaven the highway to hell; Bullet Hole; Snake
- Collection size: 1,900
- Visitors: 347,000 (2018)
- Curators: Olivier Varenne; Jarrod Rawlins; Emma Pike
- Architect: Fender Katsalidis Architects
- Owner: David Walsh
- Public transit access: Road-Metro/Taxi* River-MR-1/Seaplane
- Parking: On site
- Website: www.mona.net.au

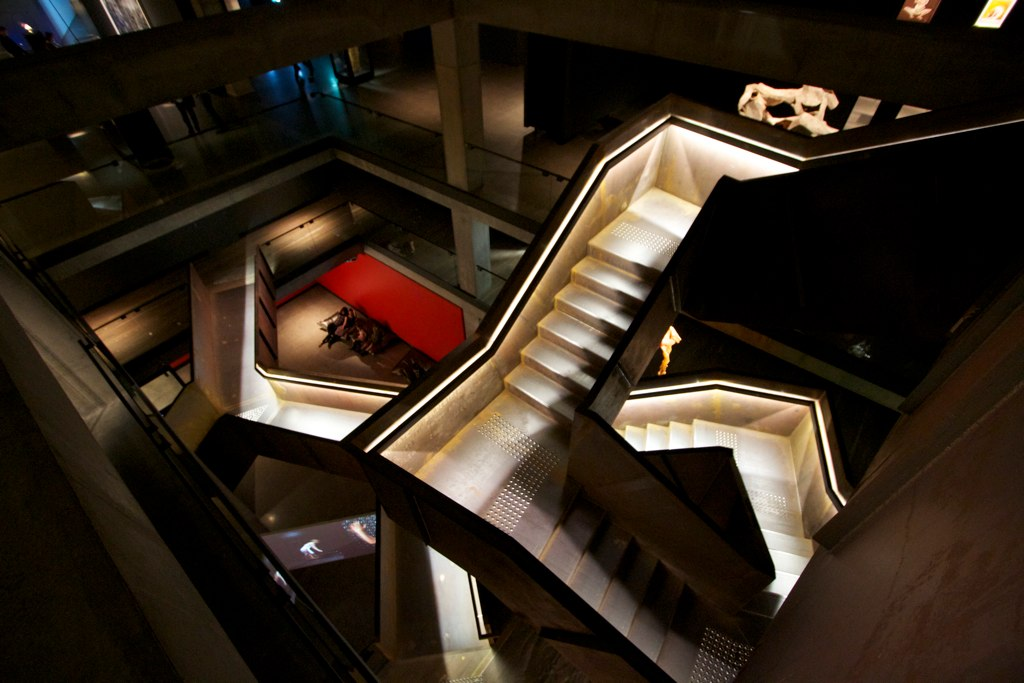
A maze of staircases and tunnels lead between MONA's three levels of art display spaces.

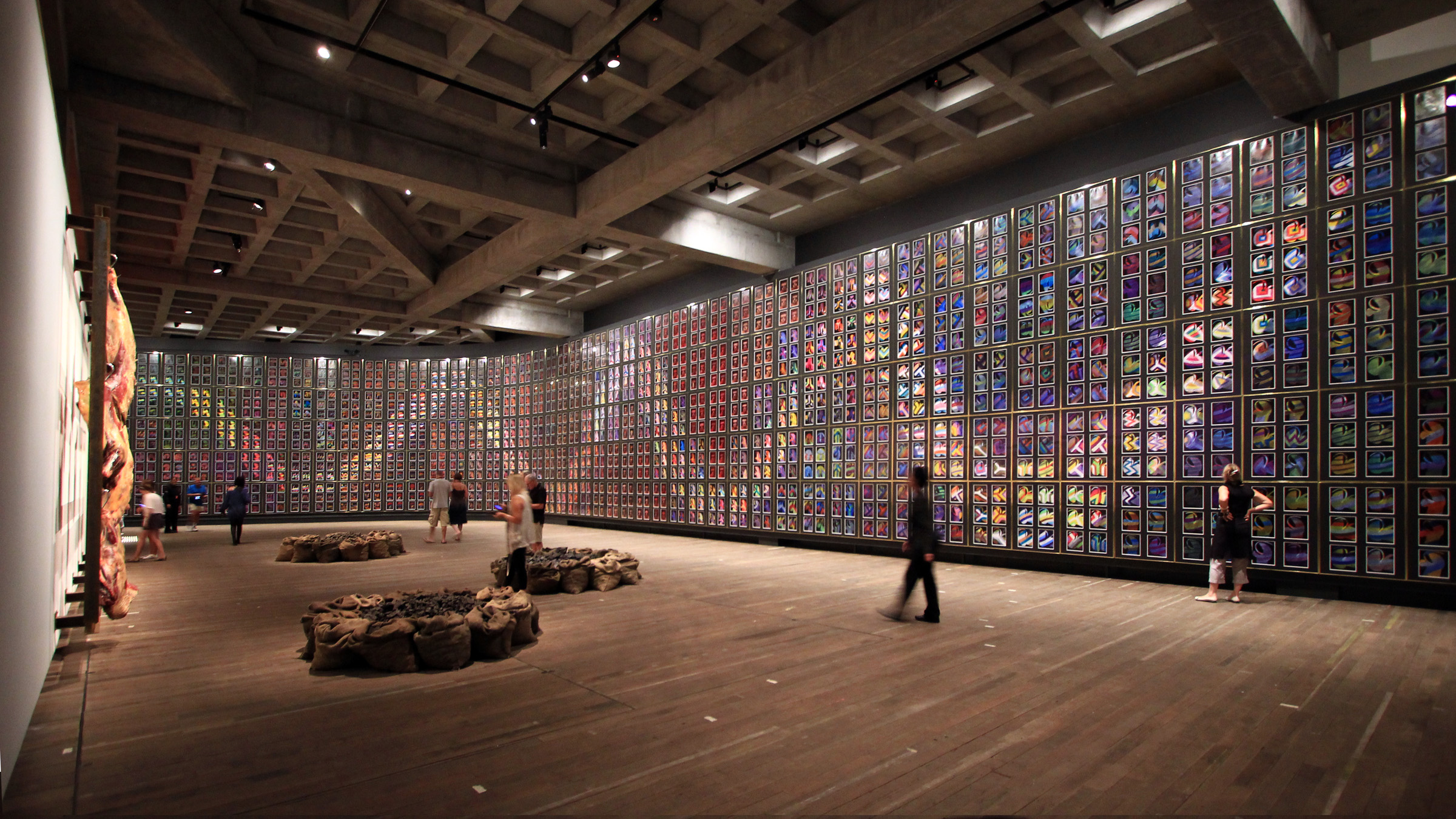
The museum was built to accommodate Sidney Nolan's Snake (1970–72), a giant Rainbow Serpent mural made of 1,620 paintings.

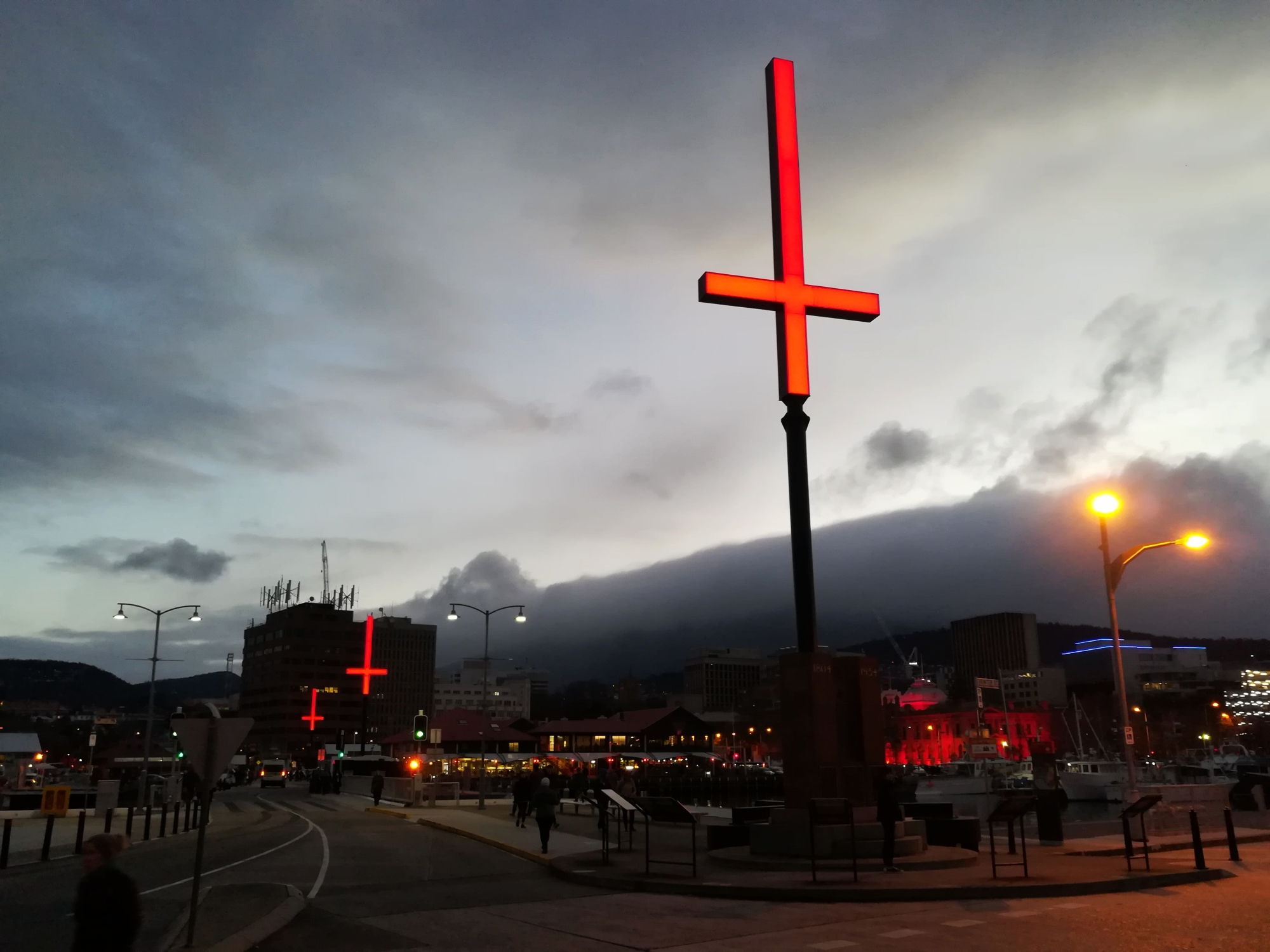
Inverted crosses on display throughout Hobart during the 2018 Dark MOFO festival

The Museum of Old and New Art (MONA) is an art museum located within the Moorilla winery on the Berriedale peninsula in Hobart, Tasmania, Australia. It is the largest privately funded museum in the Southern Hemisphere. MONA houses ancient, modern and contemporary art from the David Walsh collection. Noted for its central themes of sex and death, the museum has been described by Walsh as a "subversive adult Disneyland".

MONA was officially opened on 21 January 2011. Along with its frequently updated indoor collection, Mona also hosts the annual Mona Foma and Dark Mofo music and arts festivals which showcase large-scale public art and live performances.

In June 2026 MONA's library Phrontisterion opened. It houses David Walsh's large and growing collection of books, rare volumes, maps and manuscripts. The story behind it is revealed in Walsh's blog posting Playing the Library Card. The library took 10 years of planning, houses 30 000 books and cost $100 million. Notable items include a copy of Shakespeare's first folio, digitised so that users can "use" it without touching it, via the Dial technology. Items in the collection use geographic location their unique identifier rather than traditional systems like Dewey Decimal. Phrontisterion's opening attracted wide interest and much acclaim for its architecture, artwork, technology and collection.

== History ==
The precursor to MONA, the Moorilla Museum of Antiquities, was founded in 2001 by Tasmanian millionaire David Walsh. It closed on 20 May 2006 to undergo $75 million renovations.

The new museum was officially opened on 21 January 2011, coinciding with the third MOFO festival. The afternoon opening party was attended by 1,350 invited guests. 2,500 members of the public were selected by random ballot for the evening event which included performances by The DC3, True Live, The Scientists of Modern Music, Wire, Health and The Cruel Sea.

=== Architecture ===
The single-storey MONA building appears at street level to be dominated by its surroundings, but its interior possesses a spiral staircase that leads down to three larger levels of labyrinthine display spaces built into the side of the cliffs around Berriedale peninsula. The decision to build it largely underground was taken, according to Walsh, to preserve the heritage setting of the two Roy Grounds houses on the property. Walsh has also said that he wanted a building that "could sneak up on visitors rather than broadcast its presence ... 'a sense of danger' that would enliven the experience of viewing art". Most visitors approach by ferry up the River Derwent.

There are no windows and the atmosphere is intentionally ominous. On entering the museum, visitors descend a "seemingly endless flight of stairs", an experience one critic compared with "going down into Petra". To see the art, the visitor must work back upwards towards the surface, a trajectory that has been contrasted with the descending spiral that many visitors follow in New York's Guggenheim Museum.

Katsalidis's architecture for the museum has been praised as not only fulfilling its function as a showcase for a collection, but also succeeding as it "extends and magnifies into an experience ... there is a sense that the work, the lighting, the space and the materiality have been choreographed with subtlety and skill into a singular if hugely idiosyncratic whole."

=== Expenses ===
Operational costs of A$8 million per annum are underpinned by the winery, brewery, restaurant and hotel on the same site. In May 2011, it was announced that the museum would end its policy of free entry and introduce an entry fee to interstate and overseas visitors while remaining free for Tasmanians.

MONA also offers an unusual membership program called "Eternity Membership", which not only includes lifetime free admission but notably earns members the right to be cremated and their remains housed in the MONA Cemetery.

=== MONA Bangkok ===
On 10 July 2026, MONA and Thai real estate conglomerate Asset World Corporation (AWC) announced plans to establish MONA Bangkok, located adjacent to the Chao Phraya River. MONA Bangkok is expected to open in 2029.

== Collection ==
The museum houses over 1,900 artistic works from David Walsh's private collection. Notable works in its inaugural exhibition, Monanism, included Australia's largest modernist artwork, Sidney Nolan's Snake mural, displayed publicly for the first time in Australia; Wim Delvoye's Cloaca Professional, a machine which replicates the human digestive system and turns food into faeces, excreting it daily; Stephen Shanabrook's On the road to heaven the highway to hell, remains of a suicide bomber cast in dark chocolate; and, until it was de-accessioned and sold in 2015, Chris Ofili's The Holy Virgin Mary, a painting created partially with elephant dung. The collection was valued in 2011 at more than $100 million.

The artworks on display are in non-chronological order and without museum labels. Instead, visitors can download a mobile application called 'The O', which displays information about nearby artworks and a map of the users current location by using sensors located inside the building. Previously, 'The O' was an iPod-like device, which had similar functionality. Users of The O can select different interpretations of any given piece: 'Summary' (a brief description of the work and its artist); 'Art Wank' (curator's notes); 'Gonzo' (Walsh's personal opinions and stories), 'Ideas' (quotes and talking points); and 'Media' (oftentimes interviews with artists). Walsh also commissioned Damian Cowell, frontman of satirical Melbourne band TISM, to write and record songs about certain works for the original 'The O' device. They were released as a free album, Vs Art, with MONA's 2010 book Monanisms.

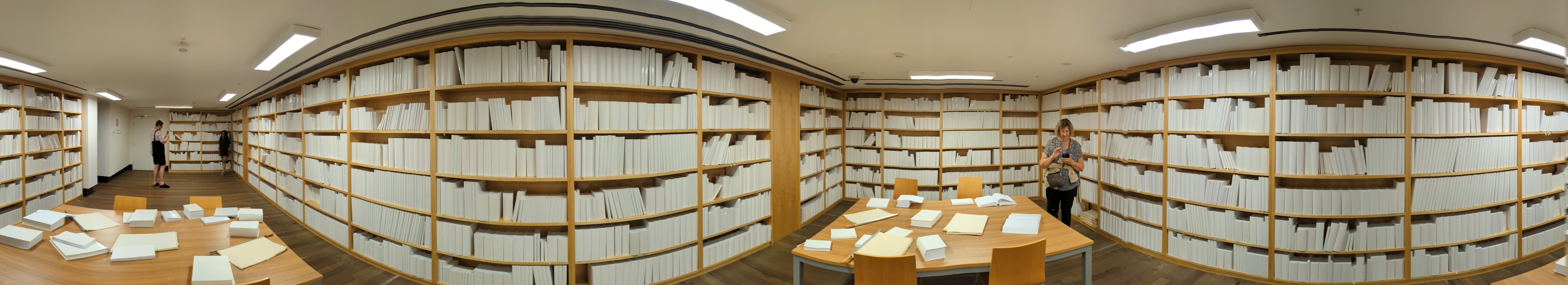
A panoramic view of Wilfredo Prieto's White Library, a collection of 6,000 blank books

=== Reception ===
Michael Connor of the conservative literary and cultural magazine Quadrant said that "MONA is the art of the exhausted, of a decaying civilisation. Display lights and taste and stunning effects illuminate moral bankruptcy. What is highlighted melds perfectly with contemporary high fashion, design, architecture, cinema. It is expensive and tense decay."

Richard Dorment, art critic for the UK newspaper The Daily Telegraph, said that Walsh "doesn't collect famous names; his indifference to fashion is one of the strengths of the collection. He likes art that is fun and grabs your attention, that packs a sting in the tail or a punch in the solar plexus."

== Discrimination lawsuit ==
In March 2024, Jason Lau, a visitor from New South Wales, filed a lawsuit against the museum, saying that it engaged in illegal discrimination by barring him from seeing its "Ladies Lounge" exhibition, which its creators had intended to provide a safe place for women to enjoy each other's company and to highlight the exclusion faced by women for decades. The museum's legal counsel acknowledged that he had been discriminated against, but added that it was part of the intended experience of the artwork. Artist Kirsha Kaechele, who is also David Walsh's wife, defended the exhibition in court, saying that "It excludes men, and I would be lying if I were to say I didn't find it titillating."

In April 2024, a court ordered MONA to cease denying persons not identifying as women into the Ladies Lounge. The museum responded by installing female toilets in the exhibit area. The toilets were initially reported to feature works by Pablo Picasso that had formed part of the original exhibit, but it was later revealed in a blog post by Kaechele that the paintings were forgeries that she had painted three years earlier.

In September 2024, Supreme Court of Tasmania Justice Shane Marshall overturned the April ruling after determining that it was legal for men to be banned from the "Ladies Lounge", because it is legal to discriminate if doing so promotes "equal opportunity" for a marginalised group.

== Music and arts festivals ==
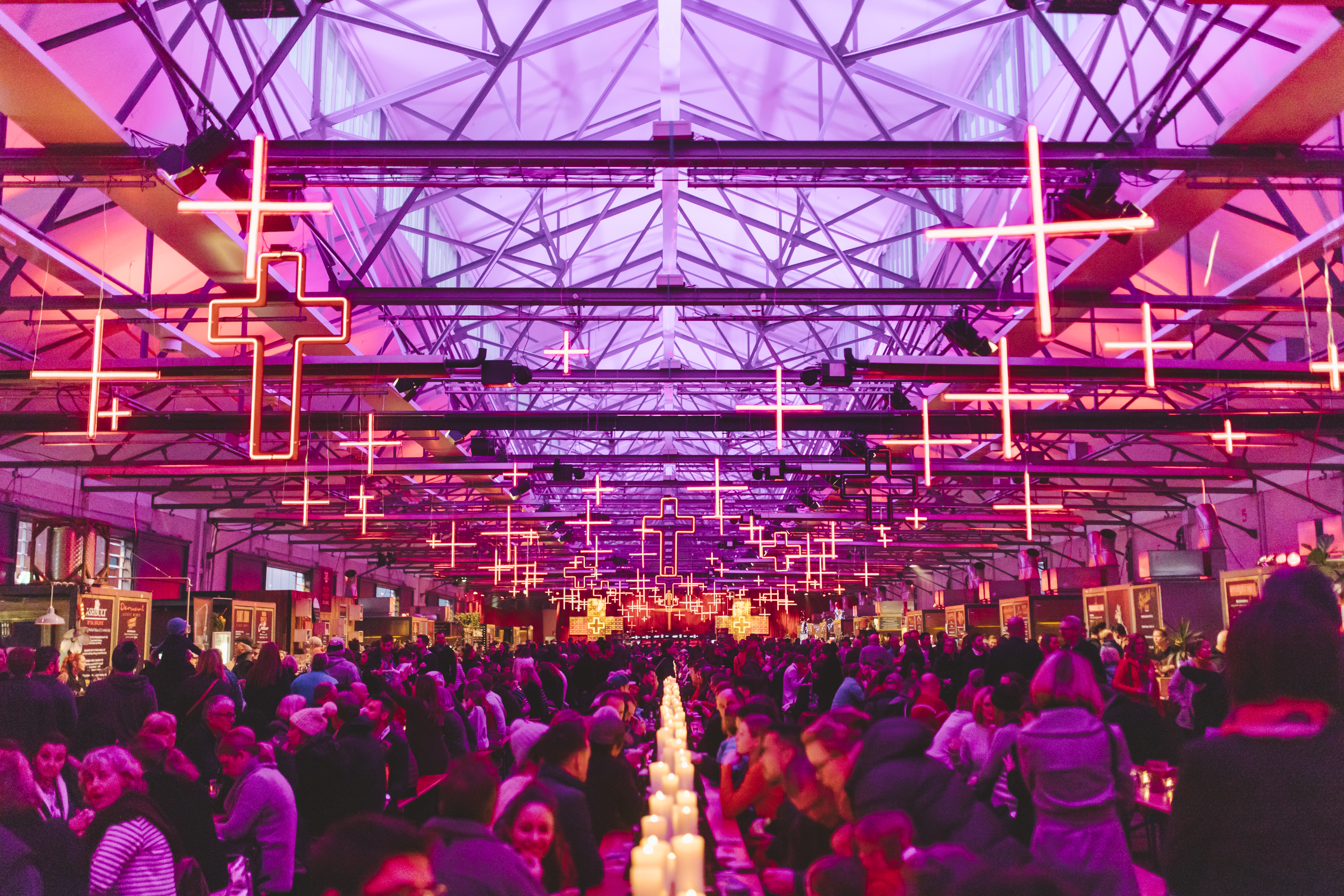
Winter Feast during the 2017 Dark Mofo festival

Mona hosted an annual outdoor Mona Foma music festival in summer, until the announcement of its cancellation in 2024. Mona's wintertime counterpart, Dark Mofo continues, with extensive public art exhibitions amid a fairground setting of food and drink, live music and entertainment. Past headliners at Mona Foma include Nick Cave and the Bad Seeds, John Cale, Godspeed You! Black Emperor, Swans, PJ Harvey and David Byrne, while Dark Mofo line-ups have featured musical acts such as Einstürzende Neubauten, Sunn O))), Laurie Anderson, Mogwai, Ulver, Autechre and Merzbow.

== Tourism ==
In 2012, Lonely Planet ranked Hobart as one of the ten must-visit cities in 2013, citing MONA as a major tourist attraction in a small city, similar to the Guggenheim Museum in Bilbao.

== Ferries ==
Name	Year built	Builder	Initial Ownership	Current Ownership / Fate	Max. Passengers
Mona Roma (MR1)	2015	Incat	Mona	Mona	251
Freya (MR2)	2018	Richardson Devine Marine	Mona	Mona	

== Gallery ==
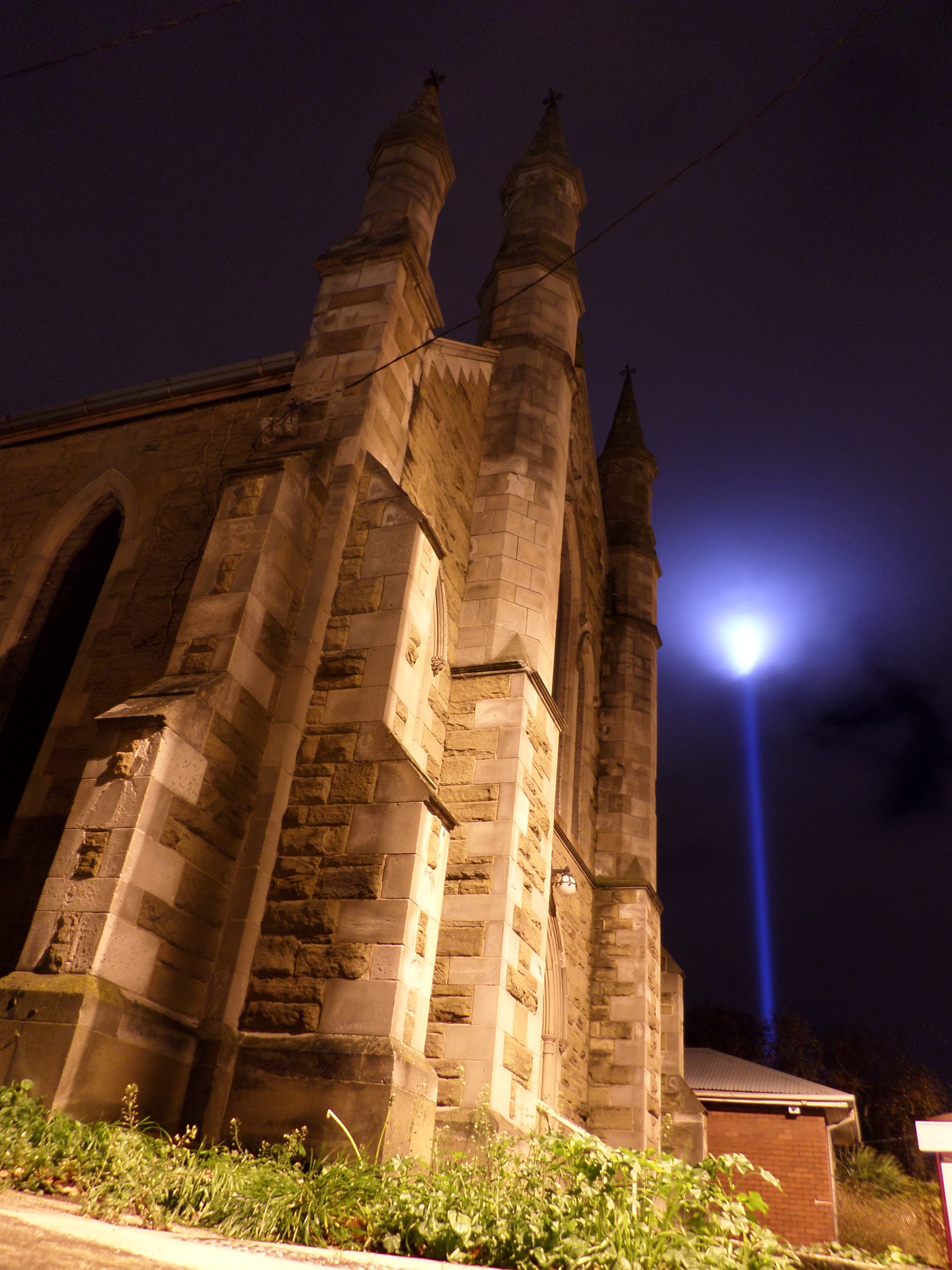
Ryoji Ikeda's sound and light installation Spectra illuminates the night sky over MONA during every Dark Mofo festival

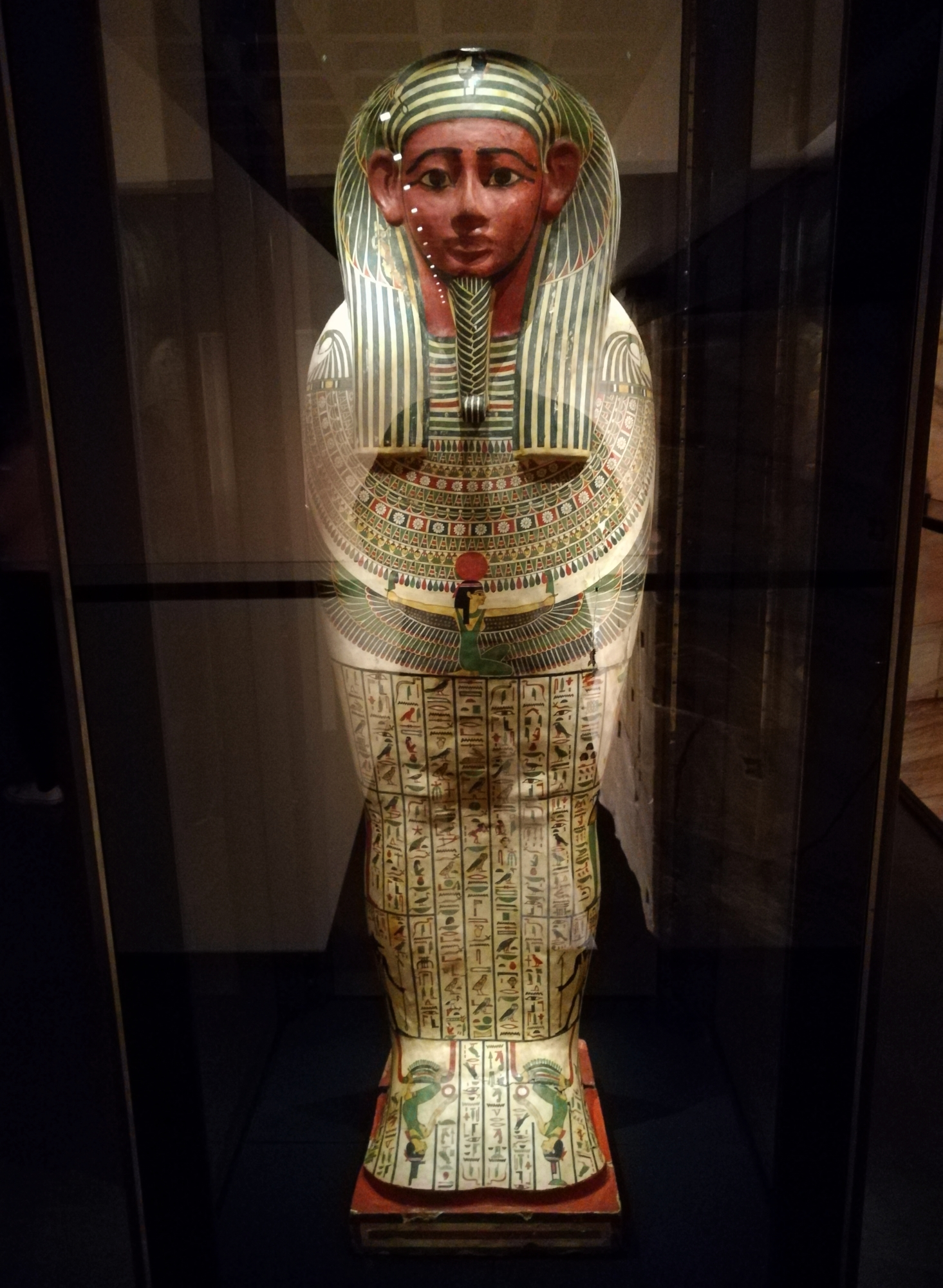
The sarcophagus of Iret-Heru-Ru, Egypt, c. 600 BCE

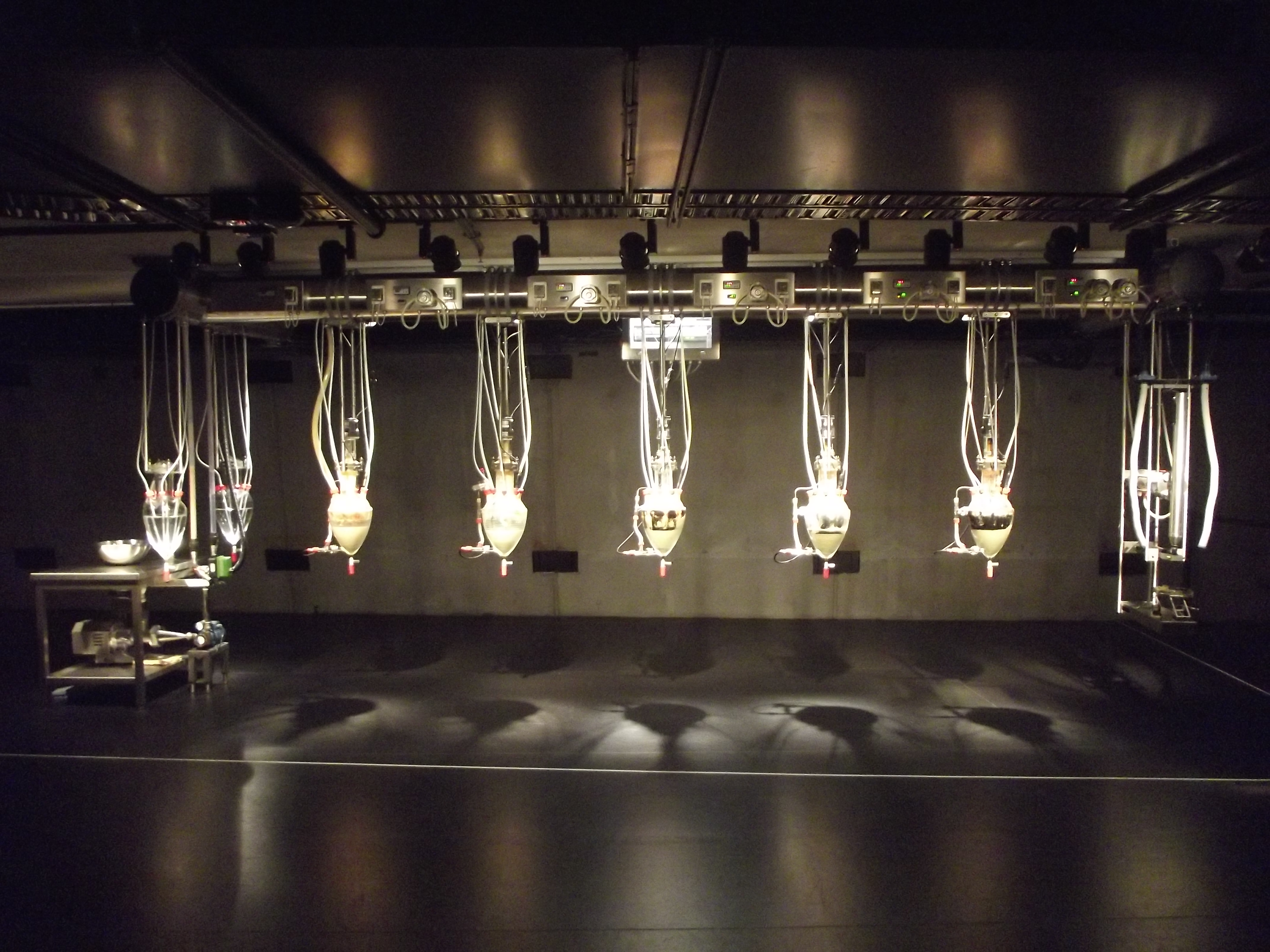
Wim Delvoye's Cloaca machine, custom-built for MONA

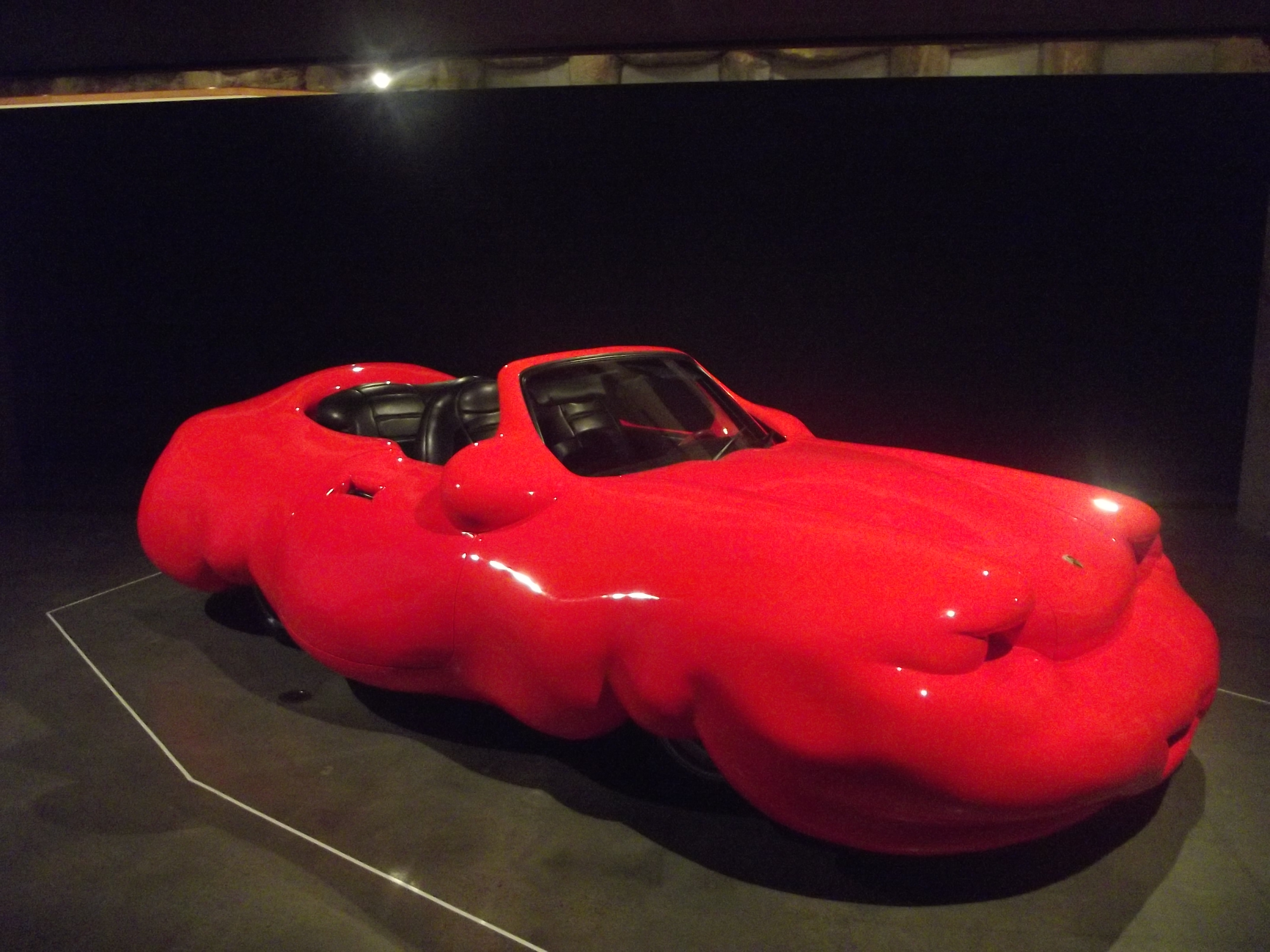
Erwin Wurm's Fat Car

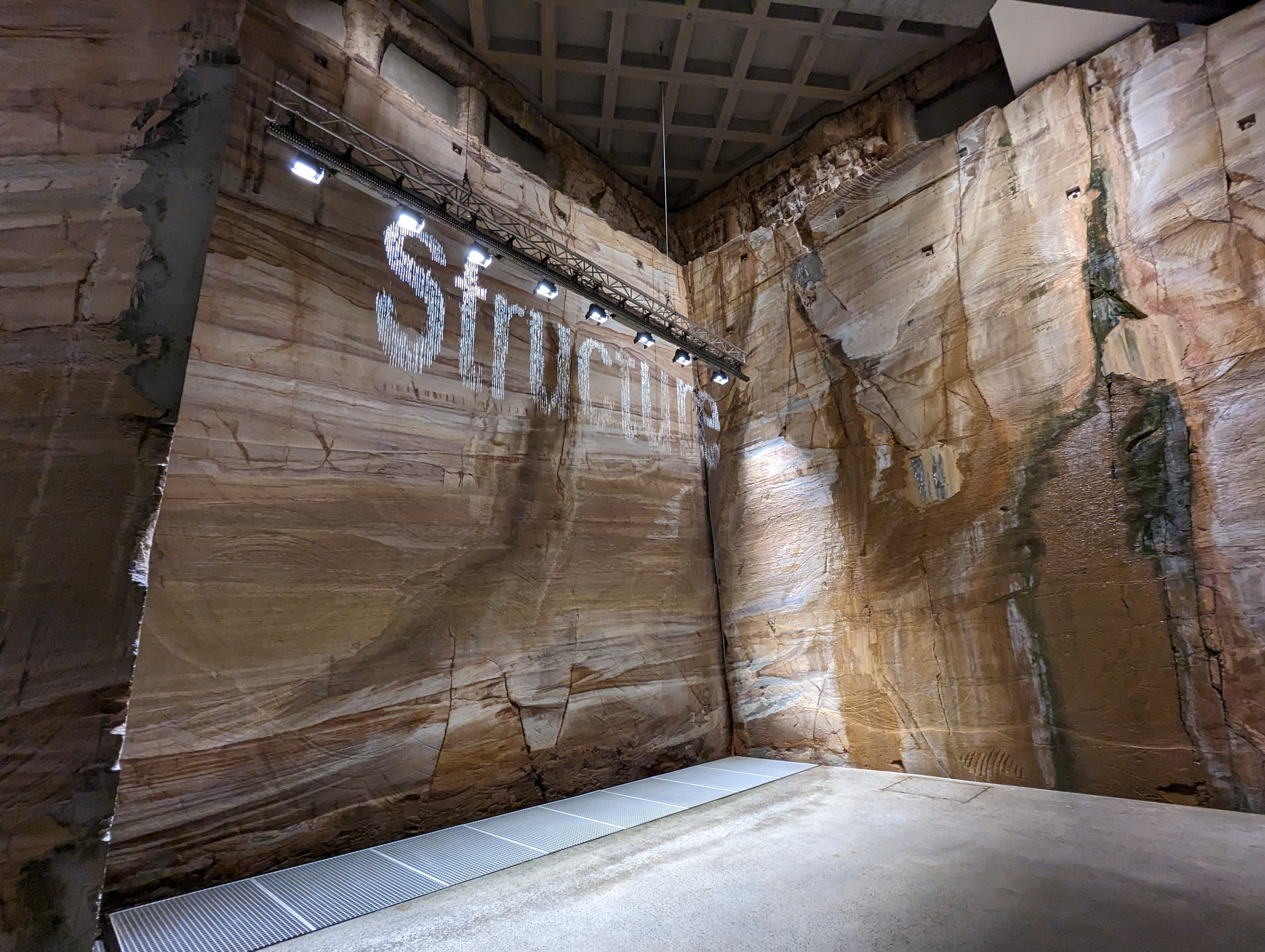
Julius Popp's Bit.fall

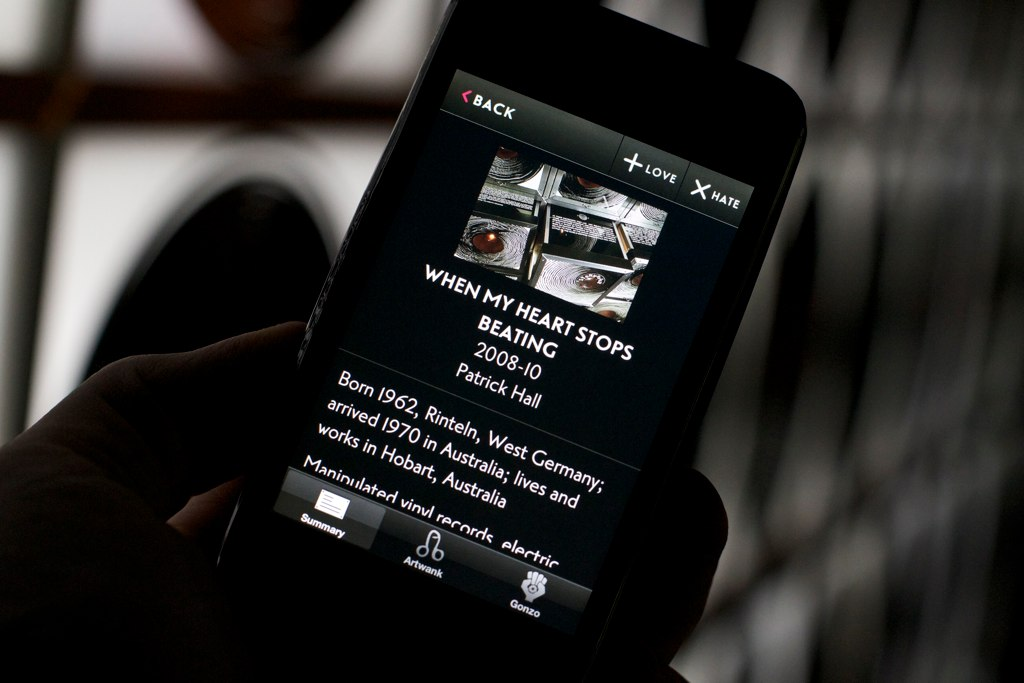
The O device

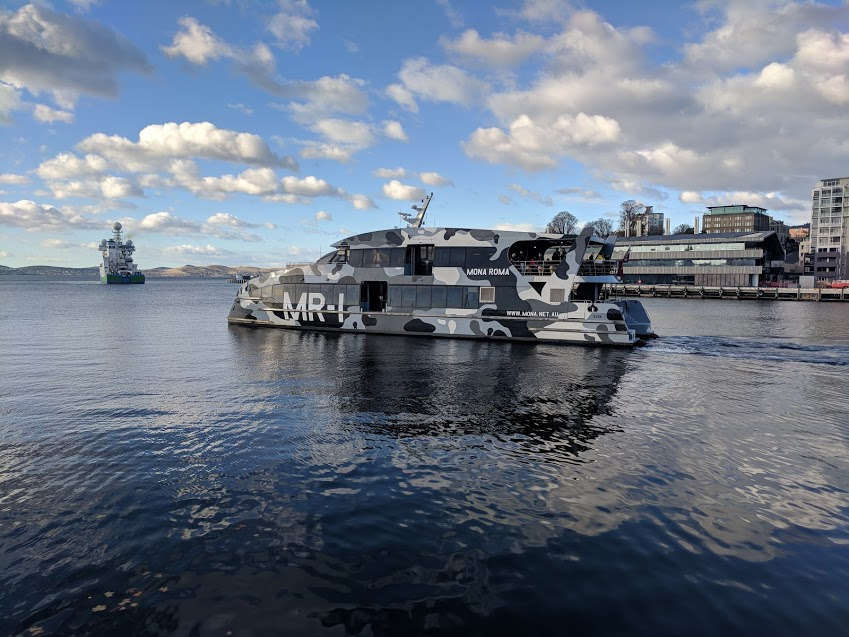
MONA ROMA ferry departs the Port of Hobart for MONA

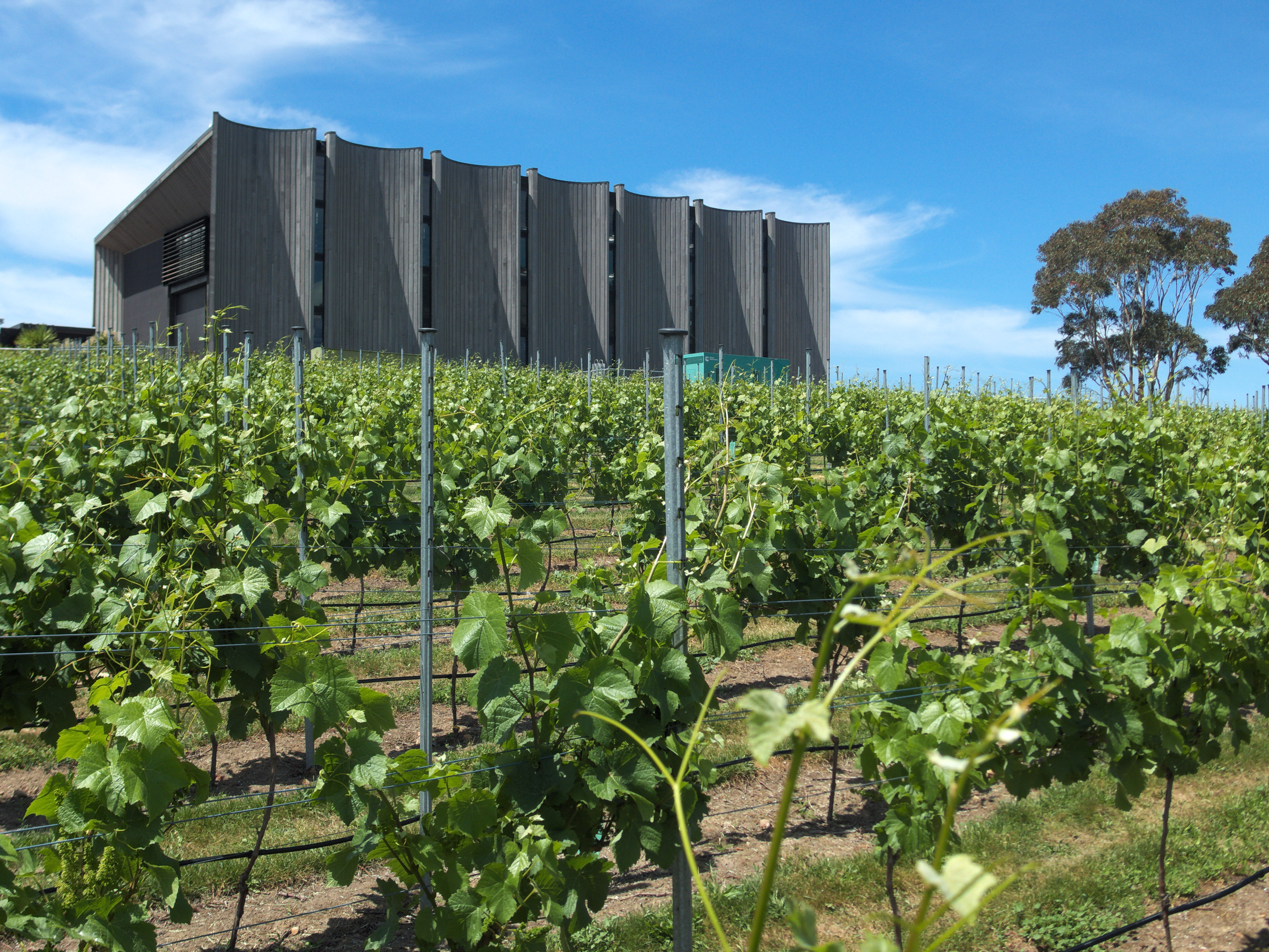
One of MONA's vineyards

== See also ==
- List of museums in Tasmania
