= Wim Delvoye =

Belgian neo-conceptual artist

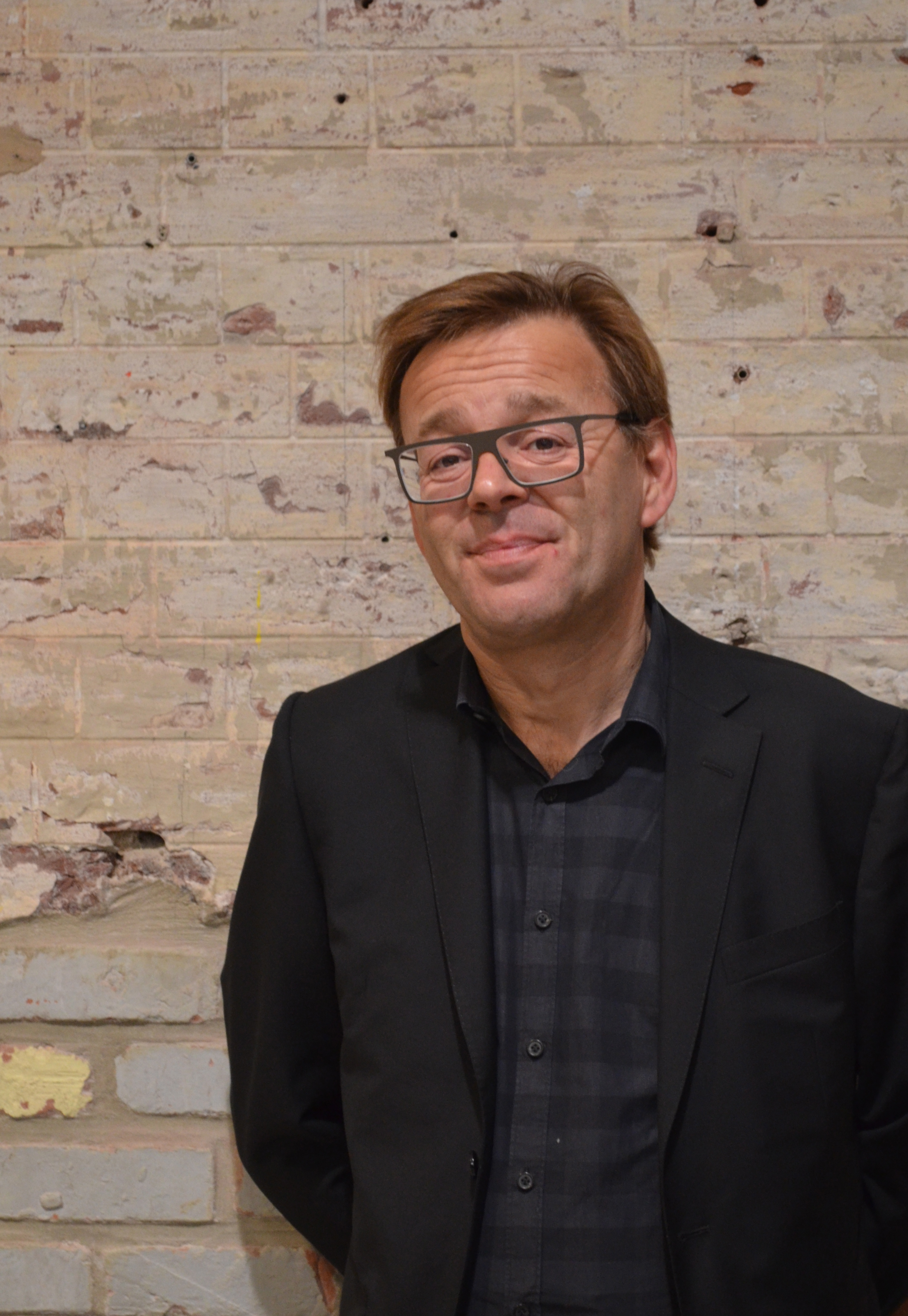
- Wim Delvoye in 2019
- Born: 1965 (age 60–61); Wervik, Belgium
- Education: Royal Academy of Fine Arts, Ghent, Belgium
- Known for: Sculpture

Wim Delvoye (born 1965 in Wervik, West Flanders) is a Belgian installation artist and sculptor.

== Early life ==
Delvoye was raised in Wervik, in West Flanders, Belgium. Although he did not have a religious upbringing, he was influenced by the Roman Catholic architecture that surrounded him. Delvoye has said that the pessimistic expectations for Belgian art students freed him, essentially making him realize that he "had nothing to lose".

== Career ==
Delvoye's work has been presented in solo exhibitions at the Tehran Museum of Contemporary Art; MUDAM, in Luxembourg; and the Museum Tinguely, in Basel, Switzerland.

In 1992, Delvoye presented his work, Mosaic, at Documenta IX, a symmetrical display of glazed tiles featuring photographs of his own excrement.

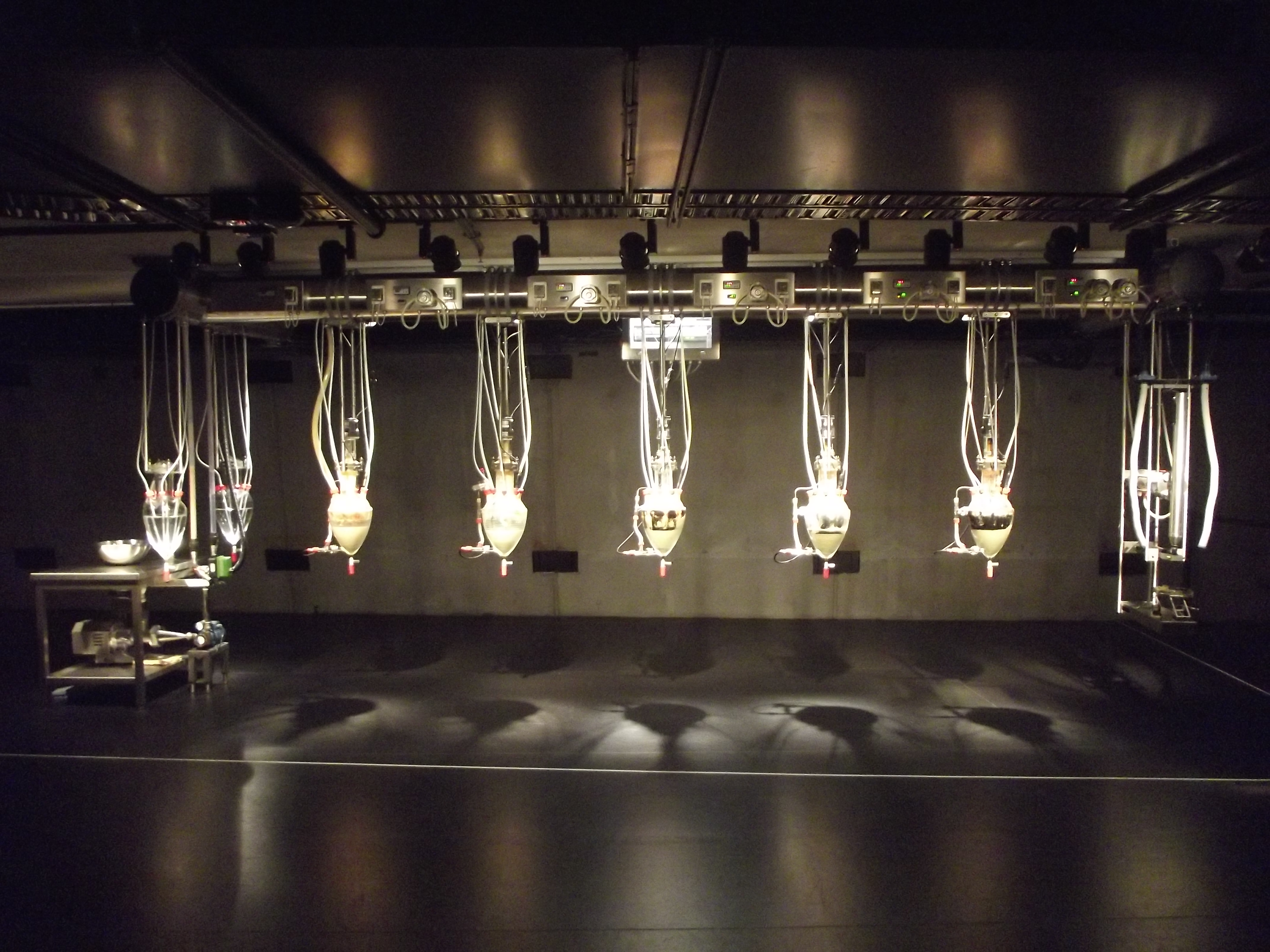
Delvoye's Cloaca is on permanent display at the Museum of Old and New Art (MONA) in Hobart, Tasmania, Australia.

Delvoye's Cloaca, is a mechanical installation that turns food into "feces". The food begins at a long, transparent bowl (mouth), travels through a number of machine-like assembly stations, and ends in hard matter which is separated from liquid through a cylinder. Delvoye's Cloaca installation series consists of ten different versions, with the original version first exhibited at the M HKA in Antwerp in 2000.

Delvoye has stated that everything in modern life is pointless. The most useless object he could create was a machine that serves no purpose at all, besides the reduction of food to waste. A ceiling-mounted version of the Cloaca machine was built specifically for Tasmania's Museum of Old and New Art's permanent collection.

Delvoye has tattooed pigs as art beginning in the 1990s. Delvoye described the process of tattooing a live pig, "we sedate it, shave it and apply Vaseline to its skin".

Delvoye also creates "gothic" style work. In 2001, Delvoye, with the help of a radiologist, had several of his friends paint themselves with small amounts of barium, and perform explicit sexual acts in medical X-ray clinics. He then used the X-ray scans to fill gothic window frames instead of classic stained glass. Delvoye suggests that radiography reduces the body to a machine.

Delvoye also works in laser-cut steel to produce sculptures of utilitarian objects typically found in construction (like a cement truck), customized in seventeenth-century Flemish Baroque style. These structures juxtapose "medieval craftsmanship with Gothic filigree".

In a 2013 show in New York City, Delvoye showed intricate laser-cut works combining architectural and figurative references with shapes such as a Möbius band or a Rorschach inkblot.

== Selected public collections ==
- SMAK, Ghent, Belgium
- Stedelijk Museum, Amsterdam, Netherlands
- Guggenheim Museum, New York, USA
- MUDAM, Luxembourg
- Centre Pompidou, Paris, France
