= Mona Foma =

Summer and winter music and arts festivals in Tasmania, Australia

- Branding of the 2022 Mona Foma festival
- Genre: Contemporary music and art
- Dates: February / March
- Locations: Tasmania, Australia: Hobart (2009–2018, 2020–2024); Launceston (2019–2024)
- Years active: 2009–2024
- Founders: David Walsh
- Website: www.monafoma.net.au

Mona Foma, stylised as MONA FOMA (an acronym for Museum of Old and New Art: Festival of Music and Art, often further shortened to MOFO) was an annual music and arts festival held in Tasmania, Australia, curated by Violent Femmes member Brian Ritchie. Recognised as Tasmania's largest contemporary music festival, it featured a broad range of artistic genres, including sound, noise, dance, theatre, visual art, performance, and new media.

A wintertime version of the festival, Dark Mofo, is held annually in June, primarily showcasing events at night.

== History ==
Mona Foma, launched in 2009, initially took place in Hobart before moving to Launceston in 2019 and hosting events across both cities commencing the following year. Known for its mix of music, performance art, and visual installations, the festival grew into a major annual cultural event in Tasmania.

=== 2009: Inaugural festival ===
The first Mona Foma was held in January 2009, headlined by Nick Cave and the Bad Seeds. The event attracted over 10,000 attendees and included a range of performances and installations across Hobart.

Act	Genre	Venue
Nick Cave and the Bad Seeds	Alternative Rock	Hobart Waterfront
The Saints	Punk Rock	Salamanca Place
The Zen Circus	Folk Punk	Princes Wharf
James Blood Ulmer	Jazz/Blues	Salamanca Arts Centre
Fuck Buttons	Noise/Electronic	Princes Wharf

=== 2010: Expanding Horizons ===
The 2010 festival featured John Cale as its first Eminent Artist in Residence (EAR), marking a step towards broader international engagement. Curator Brian Ritchie described Mona Foma as a “unique cultural experience” and referred to it as a "cultural lighthouse" in Tasmania’s arts scene.

Act	Genre	Venue
John Cale	Rock/Avant-Garde	Theatre Royal
Grandmaster Flash	Hip Hop	Hobart Waterfront
Dirty Three	Post-Rock	Salamanca Arts Centre
Black Joe Lewis and the Honeybears	Blues/Soul	Hobart Town Hall
Christian Boltanski	Installation Art	MONA Museum

=== 2011 ===
Act	Genre	Venue
PJ Harvey	Alternative Rock	Theatre Royal
The Dresden Dolls	Punk Cabaret	Hobart Waterfront
Neil Gaiman	Literary Reading	Hobart Town Hall
The Raah Project	Electronic Jazz	Salamanca Arts Centre

=== 2012 ===
Act	Genre	Venue
Philip Glass	Minimalist	Hobart Town Hall
Grinderman	Alternative Rock	Theatre Royal
Wire	Punk Rock	Salamanca Arts Centre
Tony Conrad	Avant-Garde	MONA Museum

=== 2013: Continued eclecticism ===
By 2013, Mona Foma’s programming had become widely noted for its diverse lineup. That year’s event, described as “eclectic as ever” by The Sydney Morning Herald, included experimental music, dance, and performance art, drawing both international and Australian artists.

Act	Genre	Venue
David Byrne & St. Vincent	Indie Rock	Theatre Royal
Dirty Projectors	Experimental Pop	Hobart Waterfront
Explosions in the Sky	Post-Rock	Hobart Town Hall
Swans	Noise Rock	MONA Museum

=== 2014 ===
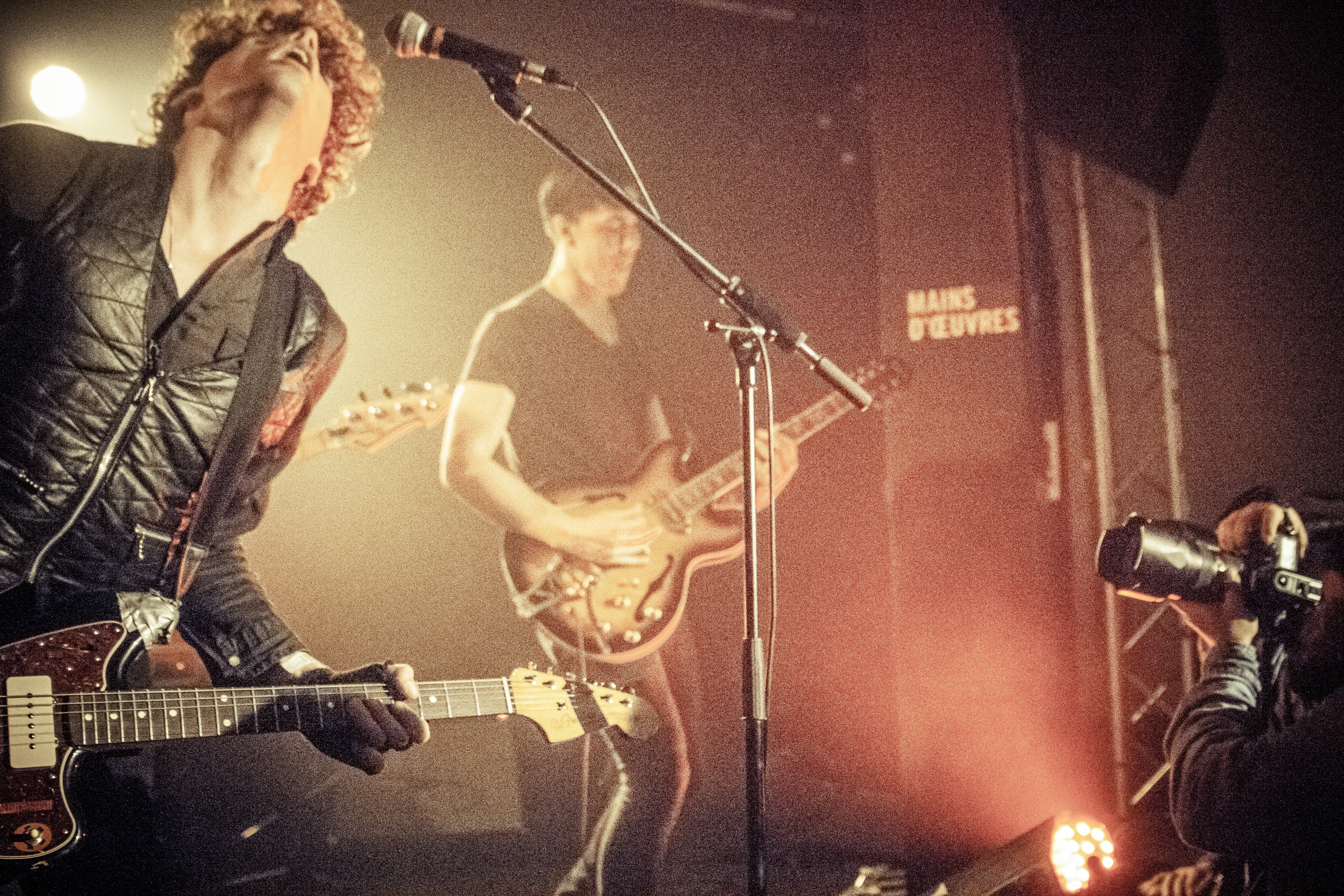
TV Ghost at MOFO 2014

Act	Genre	Venue
The Flaming Lips	Psychedelic Rock	Theatre Royal
Laibach	Industrial	Princes Wharf
The Residents	Avant-Garde	MONA Museum
Julian Cope	Rock	Hobart Town Hall
Laurie Anderson	Experimental	Theatre Royal

=== 2015: Partnership with Insite Arts ===
In 2015, Mona Foma partnered with Insite Arts to support larger, site-specific installations that aligned with the festival’s goal of creating immersive art experiences.

Act	Genre	Venue
FKA Twigs	Experimental R&B	Hobart Waterfront
Flight Facilities	Electronic	Theatre Royal
Tricky	Trip-Hop	Princes Wharf
The Church	Alternative Rock	Theatre Royal
Ben Frost	Ambient	MONA Museum

=== 2016: Experimentalism ===
The 2016 Mona Foma featured an experimental lineup with performances from Tetema (a collaboration between Mike Patton of Faith No More and Australian composer Anthony Pateras), Swans, and minimalist musician Philip Glass. Art installations ranged from immersive displays to pieces that provoked public discussion.

Act	Genre	Venue
Tetema (Mike Patton & Anthony Pateras)	Experimental Rock	Theatre Royal
Philip Glass	Minimalist	MONA Museum
Violent Femmes	Folk Punk	Hobart Waterfront
Swans	Noise Rock	Princes Wharf
Kaitlyn Aurelia Smith	Electronic	Hobart Waterfront

=== 2019: Relocation to Launceston ===
In 2019, Mona Foma relocated to Launceston, where it continued to showcase a wide range of performances and visual art. This year’s festival included installations that engaged with public spaces and continued the festival’s reputation for innovative programming.

=== 2020: Language and cultural themes ===
The 2020 festival examined themes around “music’s language barriers,” featuring artists from varied cultural backgrounds and languages, with a focus on performances that transcended traditional linguistic divides. The festival included a performance at Queen Victoria Museum & Art Gallery by Josh Foley (*performing as Xydep Xydahlia) and took place inside Foley's large scale immersive installation called Calculating Infinity which drew record crowds to the site.

=== 2021: Sidney Nolan retrospective ===
The 2021 edition featured a retrospective on Australian artist Sidney Nolan, including his experimental spray-painted works, continuing the festival’s emphasis on visual arts and its showcasing of prominent Australian artists.

=== 2023: Feminist and Indie Headliners ===
In 2023, Mona Foma’s lineup included feminist punk and indie artists such as Angel Olsen, Bikini Kill, and Peaches. This lineup highlighted the festival’s focus on diverse genres and artists.

=== 2024: Final Festival and closure ===
In April 2024, it was announced that Mona Foma would no longer continue. Founder David Walsh cited the "spell wearing off" as a primary reason for the festival's closure. The announcement marked the end of what had become a major event in Tasmania’s arts calendar.

== See also ==
- List of events in Tasmania
