= Kirsha Kaechele =

American artist (born 1976)

Kirsha Kaechele (born 1976) is an American contemporary art curator, artist, and practitioner of sustainable building design. She is founder of KKProjects, Life is Art Foundation.

== Early life ==
Kaechele was born in Topanga Canyon, California, and raised in Guam, Micronesia and Japan. Her father was a retired RAND Corporation aerospace engineer and early practitioner of Rolfing.

== Career ==
In 1994, Kaechele began an informal education with travel over land to more than fifty countries in seven years, a hands-on investigation of the idea that life designs itself. During this period, she met and mentored with a variety of thinkers, including Biosphere 2 creator John P. Allen, chemist Albert Hofmann, writers Tom Robbins and John C. Lilly, John Perry Barlow, Rodleen Getsic, psychiatrist Oscar Janiger, artist Peter Nadin and German architects building sustainably on a Sannyasin commune in Maui, Hawaii.

In 1995, she worked with the Shipibo ayahuasca shamans in the Peruvian Amazon. In 1996, she performed with La Mama theater in New York City.

On and off Kaechele attended University of California, Santa Cruz, but in 1999, left just short of graduation to work with VH1 producer Tad Low on a travel show. The production took her to remote southern Lebanon, where she remained with a group of writers, philosophers and historians in Sur (Tyre), a nonpartisan observer in Hezbollah territory.

In 2000 Kaechele moved to New Orleans and joined the downtown art scene, collaborating with artist Matt Vis (Kid Calculator) of Generic Art Solutions on performance art projects and backup dancing for musicians Quintron and Miss Pussycat, MC Tracheotomy and MC Sweet Tea. She was a member of the 9th Ward Marching Band, an avant-garde marching band founded by Quintron.

In 2006 Kaechele founded Life is Art Foundation | KKProjects, an art space composed of five deteriorating houses in the St. Roch neighborhood of New Orleans. The foundation invited local and international artists to create site-specific installations utilizing the houses and surrounding ecological and social environment as medium. Exhibitions included artists from emerging to Tony Oursler, Mel Chin, Keith Sonnier and Robert Rauschenberg.

The Life is Art Foundation was founded on an appreciation for ecological systems and natural order. The application of systems-based thinking to life and art was its core mission, as expressed through projects that married art with architecture, ecology, agriculture and human social order. The foundation served as a test site for ideas in these fields.

In 2010 Kaechele left KKProjects and moved to Tasmania to join David Walsh and MONA (Museum of Old and New Art). She transformed four of the New Orleans art installation houses into 24 Carrot, a community garden where children grow, cook and sell organic produce. The project introduces vegetables to a food desert, inspires healthy eating and teaches entrepreneurial skills. The project's 2018 expansion includes a food truck, designed by children in the program, from which they sell dishes prepared with produce they grow. Menus are created by the kids in collaboration with celebrity chefs.

Kaechele founded MONA's 24 Carrot program in Tasmania, a sister garden project in partnership with the Tasmanian Department of Education and private funders. 24 Carrot operates in twenty four schools in neighbourhoods of greatest need.

Kaechele's curatorial work in the US included a land art exhibition of a living sugar cane field sculpture in rural Louisiana by Norwegian artist Anne Senstad, large-scale, site-specific installations in New Orleans’ City Park and Botanical Gardens for Voodoo Experience, and a medical marijuana farm in California, Life is Art West, which donated all proceeds to the arts.

In 2015 Kaechele returned to New Orleans to stage a gun buyback as a conceptual artwork / performance during the New Orleans Biennial, Prospect 3. It was the largest gun buyback in New Orleans’ history and played with libertarian values by using private enterprise and the free market to create gun control. The exhibition, set in an 8th Ward car wash, was promoted on billboards and rap radio stations throughout the city, and opened with performances by bounce and rap artists Big Freedia, Hot Boy Ronald and Mr.Serv On. The installation included a recording studio, The Embassy, where youth could lay tracks with celebrated local rappers for free. The Embassy, intended to run for three months, was so popular that Kaechele decided to keep it open and build a permanent space to house the studio- as part of a larger school.

Kaechele is building a school in New Orleans with architects Assemble and Room 11 in an abandoned 9th Ward union hall. The free school will serve 14 - 25 year olds and house The Embassy recording studio, a hacking school, art school, beauty school, fashion school and 24 Carrot culinary art school. All subjects integrate science, technology and social enterprise. The MONA project is a conceptual artwork entitled P5 1 L0V3 Y0U.

In 2019, Kaechele launched the Eat the Problem exhibition at MONA: an attempt to draw attention to the problem of invasive species. In addition to an exhibition at the museum, Eat the Problem also involved the launch of a cookbook with dishes created using invasive species, and a number of feasts at MONA. Although well received by some reviewers, the exhibition also caused some controversy, with local newspaper The Mercury running a 'Cats on MONA Menu' headline and The Conversation running an essay calling it a well-meaning but elitist stunt.

== Controversy ==
In 2005, Kaechele began to buy five properties in poor condition on North Villere Street in the St. Roch neighborhood in New Orleans, an area known for gun violence and poverty. In 2006, the five houses became the headquarters of Kaechele's Life is Art Foundation | KK Projects, which staged exhibitions and other events there. Kaechele also converted some of the houses into art pieces: the facade of one house was replaced by an oversized circular bank vault door to create a "safe house"; another was "pierced" by wooden poles and resembled an "architectural voodoo doll."

In 2010, when Kaechele moved to Tasmania, she still owned the five properties and left them unoccupied. As a result, the properties deteriorated even further, adding to the neighborhood's blight, and two have been demolished. Kaechele, who owed back property taxes and code enforcement fines on the properties, blamed her inability to maintain the properties on the 2008 recession, and insisted in 2011 that she had always intended for them to be torn down and replaced by "green space". The remaining properties were used by squatters, much to the dismay of local residents.

In 2024, the Tasmanian Civil and Administrative Tribunal ruled, following a complaint by a male visitor, that the Ladies Lounge, an art exhibit at MONA that allowed entry to women only as part of its conceptualization, would be required to open for men as well. Kaechele, who appeared as a witness, was accompanied by 25 other women who were dressed in matching outfits and continuously moved in sync, which the tribunal found to be "inappropriate, discourteous and disrespectful". Kaechele later stated that the appearance had been intended as performance art. During her testimony at the tribunal, Kaechele stated a belief that women "deserve both equal rights and special privileges in the form of unequal rights," as reparation for historical discrimination, "for a minimum of 300 years." Following the ruling, the future of the exhibit is unclear; on the one hand, MONA's legal representative indicated that it would close since being forced to admit men would undermine the very point of the exhibit, while on the other hand Kaechele said that she would attempt to turn the exhibit into a toilet area and a church in order to invoke legal exemptions, and female toilet cubicles were indeed installed by June 2024. While it was initially reported that the cubicles featured artworks by Pablo Picasso which were exhibited in the original Ladies Lounge, in July 2024 Kaechele revealed that the artworks were actually forgeries that she had painted for herself three years earlier. In September 2024, Tasmanian Supreme Court Justice Shane Marshall overturned the tribunal's decision on the grounds that the installation qualified for an exemption from the state’s anti-discrimination act under a section that allows discrimination if the intention behind the action is to promote equal opportunity for a group of people who are disadvantaged or have a special need. Marshall stated that the Ladies' Lounge was legitimate because it was "highlighting the lack of equal opportunity", to which Kaechele responded that the "verdict demonstrates a simple truth: women are better than men."

== Personal life ==
Kaechele lives in Tasmania and is a curator at MONA. In March 2014, Kaechele married art collector and professional gambler David Walsh. Kaechele and Walsh have one child, Sunday Walsh.
