= Gut Health =

Australian alternative rock band

- Origin: Melbourne, Victoria, Australia
- Genres: No-wave, dance-punk
- Years active: 2021–present
- Members: Athina Uh-Oh; Adam Markmann; Dom Willmott; Eloise Murphy-Hill; Myka Wallace; Angus Fletcher
- Website: https://guthealth.space/

Gut Health are an Australian rock band based in Melbourne, Victoria. Their debut album, Stiletto, was released in 2024. The band's music has been described as no wave and dance-punk.

== History ==
Gut Health was formed in 2021 by vocalist Athina Wilson, better known by the stage name Athina Uh-Oh, and bassist Adam Markmann, who began writing when stuck together during the coronavirus pandemic in Melbourne. The band initially practiced and recorded in a storage unit in Brunswick, leading to the release of their debut EP Electric Party Chrome Girl and its lead single "Inner Norm" in 2022. Two further singles, "The Recipe and "Uh Oh", were released in 2023. The band's debut album, Stiletto, was released in October 2024. Stiletto received praise from Clash, and NME, and was listed by Rolling Stone as the eighth best Australian album of 2024. The album was announced in July 2024 with the release of a single, "Cool Moderator", a song about "youthful rebellion", and featured a music video co-directed by Athina Uh oh and Renee Kypriotis.

In 2025, the band took home the award for 'Best Independent Punk Album or EP' in the Australian Independent Record Labels Association (AIR) Awards for their debut album Stiletto, while Rolling Stone Magazine named the band in their Future of Music 2025 list, nominated them for two awards ('Breakthrough Artist' and 'Reader's Choice') and featured Stiletto in their '100 Best Australian Albums of the 2020s So Far' list at #39. Stiletto was also nominated for the 2025 Australian Music Prize 'Album of the Year' award

Between 2023 and 2025, the band toured nationally with Primal Scream, while also playing with acts like Queens of the Stone Age, Hiatus Kaiyote, Otoboke Beaver, Tropical Fuck Storm and The Black Lips. They showcased at Reeperbahn Festival and SXSW Sydney and played festivals like Dark Mofo, London Calling, Nox Orae, RISING and Meredith Music Festival, as well as embarking on three separate European tours.

In August 2025 the band revealed a standalone single, "Beat to Beat", the first new music from the band since the release of Stiletto.

== Members ==
- Athina Uh-Oh – lead vocals
- Adam Markmann – bass
- Dom Willmott – guitar, synthesizer
- Eloise Murphy-Hill – guitar, backing vocals
- Myka Wallace – drums
- Angus Fletcher – percussion, synthesizer

== Discography ==
=== Studio albums ===
List of studio albums, with selected details
Title	Album details	Peak chart positions
Title	Album details	AUS Artist
Stiletto	Released: 11 October 2024; Label: Highly Contagious, AWAL	16 (Note: Stiletto also peaked at number 8 in the ARIA Vinyl Charts.)

=== Extended plays ===
List of EPs, with selected details
Title	Details
Electric Party Chrome Girl	Released: 18 November 2022; Label: Marthouse Records
Singles '23	Released: 24 November 2023; Label: Marthouse Records

== Awards and nominations ==
=== AIR Awards ===
The Australian Independent Record Awards (commonly known informally as AIR Awards) is an annual awards night to recognise, promote and celebrate the success of Australia's Independent Music sector.

Year	Nominee / work	Award	Result	Ref.
2025	Gut Health	Breakthrough Independent Artist of the Year	Nominated	
2025	Stiletto	Best Independent Punk Album or EP	Won	

=== ARIA Music Awards ===
The ARIA Music Awards is an annual awards ceremony held by the Australian Recording Industry Association. They commenced in 1987.

Year	Nominee / work	Award	Result	Ref.
2025	Stiletto	Michael Gudinski Breakthrough Artist	Nominated	

=== Australian Music Prize ===
Year	Nominee / work	Award	Result	Ref.
2025	Stiletto	Album of the Year	Nominated	

=== Music Victoria Awards ===
Year	Nominee / work	Award	Result	Ref.
2024	Gut Health	Best Group	Won	

=== Rolling Stone Awards ===
Year	Nominee / work	Award	Result	Ref.
2025	Gut Health	Best New Artist	Nominated	
2025	Gut Health	Reader's Choice Award	Nominated	
