= Cloaca (Capri) =

The Cloaca is an archaeological site on the island of Capri, Italy. It was part of a sewage system built in Roman times. The end of the sewer is visible west of the Marina Grande. It seems to have drained a considerable part of the northern side of the island, as evidenced by many smaller drains which are believed to have led into it. The fall of the sewer has been greatly changed. Instead of having a gentle gradient from south to north, it dips steeply in the reverse direction, north to south, at an angle of 25°. This reversal of incline has occasionally been cited as evidence for the alteration of the land-level of Capri since the Roman period.
