= Jennifer Friedlander =

American cultural studies scholar

Jennifer Friedlander is an American cultural studies scholar.

Friedlander received a Ph.D. in Communication from the University of Pittsburgh, and also a Ph.D. Certificate in Cultural Studies.

She is the Edgar E. and Elizabeth S. Pankey Professor of Media Studies at Pomona College in Claremont, California and chair of the Media Studies Department.

Friedlander describes her academic work as being heavily informed by Lacanian psychoanalytic theory, critical theory, and the work of Roland Barthes, expressed in her book Real Deceptions: The Contemporary Reinvention of Realism. Earlier, she had focused more on feminist film theory and had written Feminine Look: Sexuation, Spectatorship, Subversion.

In the first half of 2021, Friedlander was Fulbright-Freud Visiting Lecturer of Psychoanalysis at the Sigmund Freud Museum in Vienna, where she worked on a new monograph ("Powers of Pleasure: The Psychopolitics of Enjoyment in Media and Popular Culture") and taught a Master's seminar at the University of Vienna.

== Books ==
- Friedlander, Jennifer (2017). Real Deceptions: The Contemporary Reinvention of Realism. Oxford University Press. ISBN 978-0190676124.

Real Deceptions contends, in opposition to many enduring understandings, that realism’s radical political potential emerges not by revealing deception but precisely by staging deceptions – particularly deceptions that imperil the very categories of true and false. Deception, Friedlander argues, does not function as an obstacle to truth, but rather as a necessary lure for snaring the truth. Rather than seeking to unearth the truth behind fiction, this book argues that we would do better to turn our attention to the truth of fiction. Friedlander draws upon insights from a range of cultural theorists, most notably Jacques Rancière, Jacques Lacan, and Jean Baudrillard.

- Friedlander, Jennifer (2008). Feminine Look: Sexuation, Spectatorship, Subversion. SUNY series in Psychoanalysis and Culture. SUNY (State University of New York) Press. ISBN 978-0791472958.

Friedlander examines how the Lacanian concept of sexuation provides a context for a new understanding of the interactions of feminism, psychoanalysis, and spectatorship.
- "Feminine Look continuously retells and (re)explores several theories as Friedlander employs them to contrast the inscribed and approved methods of late twentieth-century scholarly work on sexuation and spectatorship, and as she explores her conceptualization and subversion of these theories she suggests a new politics of the image as well as a new theoretical approach." — Hungarian Journal of English and American Studies
- "Friedlander [contributes to] the field of feminist visual-media theory and female spectatorship by returning to its origins in Lacanian studies. By reinvestigating the role Lacan played in those studies, vis-à-vis Freud, Saussure, and Barthes, she creates a playful new space for contemplating the gendered look. She also offers a theoretical account of how contemporary photography and other technological 'gaze' media represent gendered images through unconscious and linguistic devices." — Laura Hinton
- "Most of the recent work on the feminine look, while not as critical of pleasure [as previous work], has not reincorporated psychoanalysis. Jenniefer Friedlander's Feminine Look works to fill this lacuna as it brings these components back together again to argue for a feminist theory of the feminine look that incorporates pleasure rather than reacting against it." — Hilary Neroni

- Friedlander, Jennifer (1998). Moving Pictures: Where the Police, the Press and the Art Image Meet. Sheffield Hallam University Press. ISBN 978-0791472958.
