= Sassy 009 =

Norwegian musician

Sunniva Lindgård, better known as Sassy 009, is a Scandinavian musician originally from Oslo, Norway.

== History ==
The name Sassy 009 comes from Lindgård's SoundCloud username. Contrary to the dominant narrative, Sassy 009 did not begin as a trio. Before she released anything, it was Lindgård's online display name on SoundCloud and her nickname at school. The three-piece line-up with classmates Teodora Georgijević and Johanna Scheie Orellana formed to play that material live, which was when the project really kicked off, but both left before the release of KILL SASSY 009. As a trio, they released one EP together, titled Do You Mind, in 2017. In May 2018, the trio was featured as The Guardian's "Ones to Watch". In August 2019, a new song titled "Thrasher" was released. In October 2019, The Fader premiered a new song from Sassy 009, stating that Lindgård is the only member currently involved in the project.

== Discography ==
=== Albums ===
- Kill Sassy 009 (2019)
- Heart Ego (2021)
- Dreamer+ (2026)

=== EPs ===
- Do You Mind (2017)
- Heart Ego (Live in Jakob Kirke) (2023)
