= Hilary Neroni =

Professor of literature (born 1969)

Academic background
- Education: Clark University (B.A.); University of Southern California (M.A., PhD)
- Thesis: Girls, Guns, and Romance: The Violent Woman in Contemporary American Film (1999)
- Doctoral advisor: Todd Boyd, Marsha Kinder, Douglas Thomas
- Other advisor: Walter A. Davis

Academic work
- Discipline: Film studies
- Institutions: University of Vermont
- Website: https://www.uvm.edu/cas/english/profile/hilary-neroni

Hilary Lynn Neroni (born 1969) is a professor of English literature and film studies at the University of Vermont.

== Life and works ==
- Neroni, Hilary (2016-01-28). Feminist Film Theory and Cléo from 5 to 7. Bloomsbury Publishing USA. ISBN 978-1-5013-1371-4.
- Neroni, Hilary (2015-05-05). The Subject of Torture: Psychoanalysis and Biopolitics in Television and Film. Columbia University Press. doi:10.7312/columbia/9780231170710.001.0001. ISBN 978-0-231-17071-0.
- Neroni, Hilary (2012-02-16). The Violent Woman: Femininity, Narrative, and Violence in Contemporary American Cinema. SUNY Press. doi:10.1515/9780791483640. ISBN 978-0-7914-8364-0.
