= David Walsh (art collector) =

Australian art collector

David Walsh AO
- Born: David Dominic Walsh; 1961 (age 64–65)
- Known for: Art collector, professional gambler, businessman

David Dominic Walsh AO (born 1961) is an Australian professional gambler, art collector and businessman. He is the owner of the Museum of Old and New Art (Mona) and Moorilla Estate.

== Background ==
Walsh grew up in a Roman Catholic family in the Glenorchy district of Hobart, Tasmania, Australia, the youngest of three children. He attended Dominic College, and the University of Tasmania, where he briefly studied mathematics and computer science in 1979. Walsh made his fortune by developing a gambling system used to bet on horse racing and other sports.

Walsh describes himself as a "rabid atheist". He has been married twice, the second time in March 2014, to artist Kirsha Kaechele. He has three children from different relationships, including one with Kaechele.

In 2001, he founded the Moorilla Museum of Antiquities on the Berriedale peninsula in Hobart, which closed in 2007 to undergo $75 million renovations. It was re-opened in January 2011 as the Museum of Old & New Art (MONA). It won the 2012 Australian Tourism Award for best new development and is a major Tasmanian tourist attraction.

In 2009, Walsh and his syndicate reportedly won $16–17 million over the Spring Racing Carnival.

In July 2012, Walsh was involved in a dispute with the Australian Taxation Office, which demanded he pay $37 million from the profits of his gambling system.

In October 2014, Walsh's book A Bone of Fact was published. The publisher described it as Walsh's "utterly unconventional and absorbing memoir".

In the 2016 Australia Day Honours, Walsh was made an Officer of the Order of Australia for "distinguished service to the visual arts through the establishment of MONA, and as a supporter of cultural, charitable, sporting and education groups".
