= Recognition of same-sex unions in Albania =

Albania does not recognize same-sex marriages or civil unions. A bill to legalize same-sex marriage was introduced to Parliament in 2009 with the support of Prime Minister Sali Berisha, but was never put to a vote.

== Civil unions ==
Albania does not recognize civil unions (Albanian: bashkim civil, pronounced [baʃˈkim tsiˈvil]) which would offer same-sex couples some of the rights, benefits and obligations of marriage. In June 2020, the European Commission against Racism and Intolerance noted that the absence of legal recognition for same-sex couples "could lead to various forms of discrimination and should be rectified", advising the Parliament of Albania to pass legislation recognizing same-sex partnerships. As a member of the Council of Europe, Albania falls under the jurisdiction of the European Court of Human Rights (ECHR). In January 2023, the Grand Chamber of the European Court of Human Rights ruled in Fedotova and Others v. Russia that Article 8 of the European Convention on Human Rights, which guarantees a right to private and family life, imposes a positive obligation on all member states of the Council of Europe to establish a legal framework recognising same-sex unions.

== Same-sex marriage ==
=== Background ===
Laws regarding same-sex partnerships in Europe¹ Marriage Civil union Limited domestic recognition (cohabitation) Unrecognized Constitution limits marriage to opposite-sex couples ¹ May include recent laws or court decisions that have not yet entered into effect.

During communist rule, cohabitation between unmarried partners was outlawed and marriage was strongly encouraged as "the legal basis of creating a family". Homosexuality and same-sex unions were outlawed in Albania until 1995, three years after the end of communist rule. The Constitution of Albania, ratified in 1998, does not explicitly forbid the recognition of same-sex marriages. Article 53 states that:

Everyone has the right to marry and have a family. Marriage and family enjoy special protection of the state. (Note: Albanian: Kushdo ka të drejtë të martohet dhe të ketë familje. Martesa dhe familja gëzojnë mbrojtjen e veçantë të shtetit.)

Article 7 of the Family Code (Kodi i Familjes) states that "marriage is contracted between a man and a woman who have reached the age of 18 years." Prime Minister Sali Berisha announced in a cabinet meeting on 29 July 2009 that the Council of Ministers would push for a bill to recognise marriages between partners of the same sex. He said that the bill had already been introduced to the Parliament of Albania. The Socialist Party expressed support for opening a debate on the issue. However, several politicians from the Democratic Party, including Mesila Doda, Genc Ruli and Sokol Olldashi, strongly opposed the legalization of same-sex partnerships or marriage. On 5 February 2010, the Albanian Parliament passed an anti-discrimination law banning discrimination on the grounds of sexual orientation. Gay rights groups praised the new law but said they hoped that Berisha would eventually keep to his promise on legalising same-sex marriage. Berisha reiterated his support in 2013. People's Advocate Igli Totozani announced in October 2013 that he would be drafting a bill on changes to the Family Code to legalise same-sex marriage. In April 2018, the new People's Advocate, Erinda Ballanca, expressed her support for same-sex marriage and pledged to support LGBT rights. As of 2024, no change has happened, with LGBT activists criticising the legislative inaction.

On 19 May 2024, a lesbian couple, Alba Ahmetaj and Edlira Mara, held a marriage ceremony on the roof of the office of Mayor Erion Veliaj in Tirana. The marriage was officiated by two British priests. Although it lacks legal recognition, the marriage was described in the media as the "first same-sex marriage in Albania". The couple also filed a formal application for a marriage license two days prior, saying, "Our request for a declaration of marriage symbolizes the first link in a long and difficult, but above all just, struggle. We are determined to follow the legal path and respect the procedures and institutions of our country, challenging the discriminatory content of the Family Code, to seek the recognition of our right to marry, equally with every other couple in Albania."

=== Court cases ===
In 2017, Kristi Pinderi, executive director of the organisation PRO LGBT, announced his intention to file a lawsuit to legalise same-sex partnerships. In 2022, activist Xheni Karaj echoed plans to achieve legal recognition of same-sex relationships through the courts; "We tried this way of changing the Family Code before, but we have seen that there is no political will to move it forward, and since we see that there is no political will, we are thinking of using the path of strategic litigation. This is a path where a couple or several couples belonging to the community follow the legal path and go through all the judicial stages in Albania – and then take the case to Strasbourg, as many other countries have done before", said Karaj.

=== Religious performance ===
The proposal to legalise same-sex marriage in 2009 was widely condemned by Albania's largest religious denominations, with spokespeople from the Muslim and Catholic communities calling it a "sham" and "unacceptable". In January 2024, the Albanian Orthodox Church released a statement condemning same-sex marriages, stating that "the perpetuation of humanity had been based on two sexes and their union" and calling it "a clash with the natural order".

== Public opinion ==
A December 2022 Ipsos survey showed that 26% of Albanians considered same-sex marriage "acceptable" (16% "completely" and 10% "mainly"), while 70% considered it "unacceptable" (66% "completely" and 7% "mainly"). This represented a large increase of support from 2015 when 10% of Albanians supported same-sex marriage. With regard to specific rights, 66% of respondents supported the right of same-sex couples to receive survivor pension benefits in case of the partner's death.

== See also ==
- LGBT rights in Albania
- Recognition of same-sex unions in Europe
- Balkan sworn virgins (burrnesha; women who take a vow of chastity and live as men, sometimes to avoid arranged marriages or to be able to inherit the family's wealth)
