= LGBTQ rights in Albania =

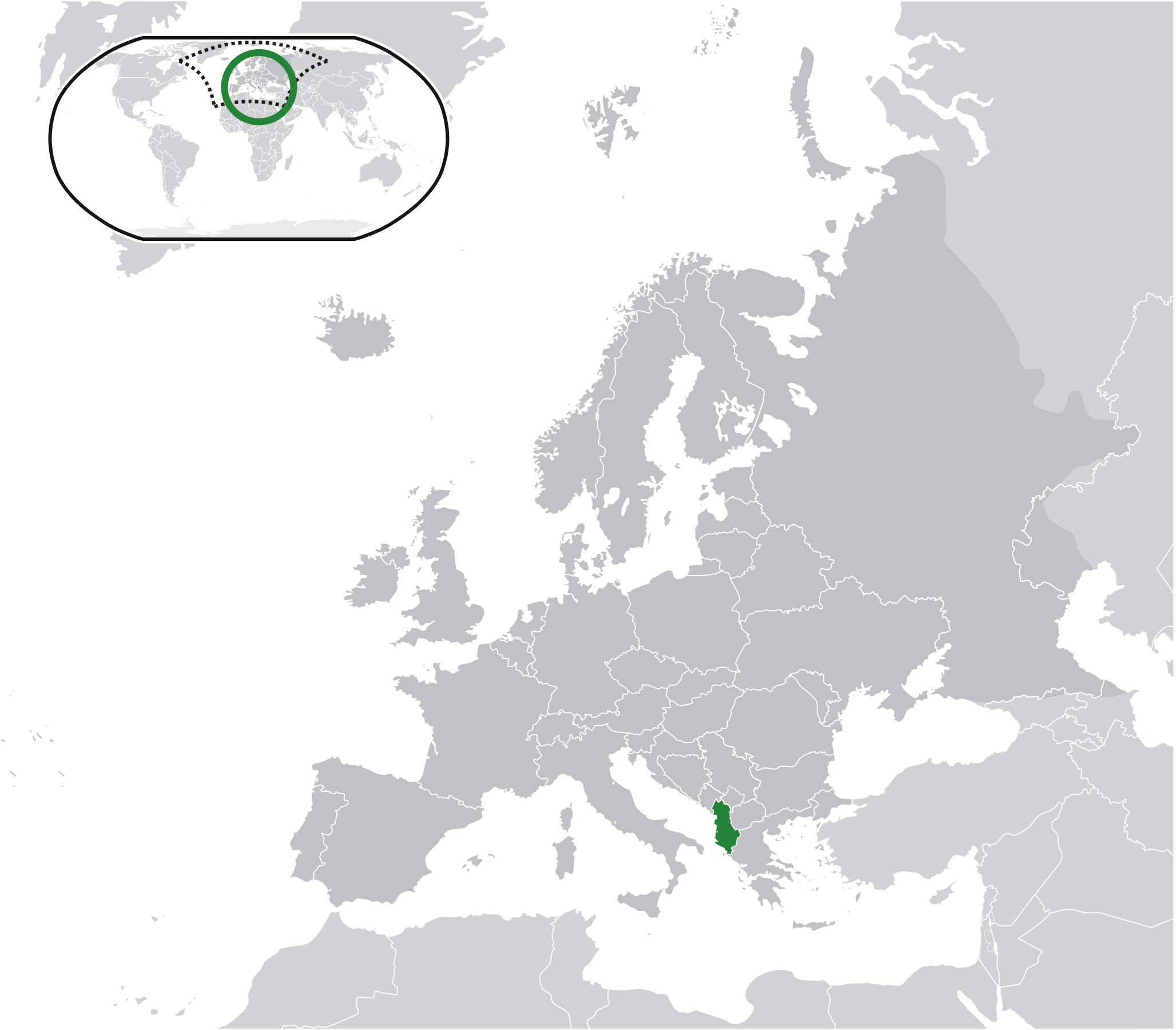
- Location of Albania (green) in Europe (dark grey) – [Legend]
- Legal status: Legal since 1995, age of consent equalized in 2001
- Gender identity: No
- Military: Gays and lesbians are allowed to serve since 2008
- Discrimination protections: Sexual orientation, gender identity and sex characteristics protections

Family rights
- Recognition of relationships: No recognition of same-sex couples
- Restrictions: Same-sex marriage and cohabitation constitutionally banned
- Adoption: Single people allowed to adopt

Lesbian, gay, bisexual, and transgender (LGBT) people in Albania face legal challenges not experienced by non-LGBT residents, although LGBT people are protected under comprehensive anti-discrimination legislation. Both male and female same-sex sexual activities have been legal in Albania since 1995, but households headed by same-sex couples are not eligible for the same legal protections available to opposite-sex couples, with same-sex unions not being recognized in the country in any form.

Albania, as a whole, is considered to be rather conservative, especially in public reactions regarding lesbian, gay, bisexual, transgender (LGBTQ) rights and visibility of LGBT people; however, anti-discrimination legislation have made ILGA-Europe regard Albania as one of a very few countries in Europe which explicitly bans discrimination on the grounds of gender identity. Albania has ratified Protocol No. 12 to the European Convention for the Protection of Human Rights and Fundamental Freedoms; moreover, Albania was a signatory to the 2007 UN Declaration on Sexual Orientation and Gender Identity.

In 2015, the association ILGA-Europe ranked Albania 19th in terms of LGBT rights out of 49 observed European countries. Meanwhile, on the latest report in 2022, lack of progress caused Albania to be ranked the 28th country in Europe, among 49 countries observed.

== Law regarding same-sex sexual activity ==
=== Ottoman Empire ===
In 1858, the Ottoman Empire legalized same-sex sexual intercourse.

=== Zogist era ===
In 1937, Musa Juka, the minister of interior, was concerned with the practice of homosexuality and wanted to "take measures with all possible means" against its practice.

=== People's Socialist Republic of Albania ===
The People's Socialist Republic of Albania penalized same-sex sexual intercourse with long prison terms, bullying and ostracism. Article 137 of the Crimes against Societal Moral of the Penal Code stated that: "Pederasty is punishable or up to ten years of freedom privation". The word "pederasty" was used as a code word for sex between two consenting adults or sex between an adult and a child of any gender.

=== Republic of Albania ===
The age of consent has been equal at 14 for all, regardless of gender and/or sexual orientation, since 2001.

In the summer of 1994 the government of Albania put forward a draft Penal code under which homosexuality would have remained illegal, but with the maximum sentence reduced from the previous ten years in prison to three years. A campaign by the Gay Albania Society within Albania, led by Genci Xhelaj, and international pressure orchestrated by ILGA, in which the Council of Europe played an important role, led to the withdrawal of this draft law.

On 20 January 1995 the Albanian Parliament legalized consensual same-sex sexual relations in Albania.

== Recognition of same-sex relationships ==
Same-sex marriage or civil unions are not currently recognised in Albania. Even though then Prime Minister Sali Berisha announced in July 2009 that he would support the recognition of civil marriages, the proposed anti-discrimination law, unanimously approved on 4 February 2010, never addressed same-sex marriage. Gay rights groups praised the new law but said they hoped that Berisha would eventually keep to his promise on legalising same-sex marriage.

Igli Totozani, the then People's Advocate, announced in October 2013 that he would be drafting a bill for parliament to debate on changes to the family code that would allow for same-sex marriage to be introduced. But as of 2024 no change has happened, with LGBT activists criticising the inaction of the government.

Following a 2024 declaration, the Orthodox Church of Albania was accused by ILGA-Europe of disseminating disinformation via "pro-family" groups, specifically regarding claims of "propaganda" and LGBTQ "infiltration" of schools. The Church's official position defined same-sex marriage as an "unnatural deviation" and a "foreign imposition" that contradicts the "natural order." Despite human rights organizations labeling such rhetoric as false, the Church maintained that legalizing same-sex marriage would result in "social catastrophes" and violate the "natural order" of the family.

== Discrimination protections ==
On 4 February 2010, the Albanian Parliament unanimously adopted a comprehensive anti-discrimination law which bans discrimination on the grounds of sexual orientation and gender identity. The law applies to all areas, including employment, the provision of goods and services, education, health care, and housing. Albania is one of only few European countries to explicitly ban discrimination on the basis of gender identity. The law also exceeds EU minimum standards, which require that employers refrain from discrimination on the basis of sexual orientation. According to this law an institution of Anti-Discrimination Commissioner was established during 2010 and the Parliament elected Irma Baraku as head of this independent body.

However, on 12 December 2012 The Alliance against Discrimination and Pro LGBT, two organizations that promote the rights of LGBT people, expressed their disappointment for what they called "the weak and unprofessional work done by the Commissioner Against Discrimination". According to Xheni Karaj and Kristi Pinderi, leaders of these organizations, the LGBT community "has lost its trust in the institution due to its slow work, raise of the deliberate bureaucratic impediments and its prolonged process of investigation without providing an explanation or a substantial argument".

They argued that out of nine cases linked to the discrimination of LGBT people directly or through hate speech, only one case has been concluded by this institution. The most disputed case of homophobia and hate speech was the case of Ekrem Spahiu Deputy Minister of Defense who stated to a local newspaper: "What remains to be done is to beat them up with a stick. If you don't understand this, I can explain it: to beat them with a rubber stick". The EU Delegation in Tirana, Human Rights Watch, Amnesty International and ILGA-Europe, the local and international media covered and condemned this statement, even the Prime Minister Sali Berisha condemned it publicly, but the Commissioner failed to follow up the case.

On 4 May 2013 the Albanian Parliament unanimously amended the criminal code and put hate crimes against sexual orientation and gender identity on par with an offense against gender, race, ethnicity, religious belief, disability and so on. It also passed a new law punishing the dissemination of homophobic information through any means (including the internet) by a fine and up to two years imprisonment.

In October 2020, Albania's anti-discrimination law was expanded to prohibit discrimination on the grounds of sex characteristics and HIV status.

=== LGBT issues in public education ===
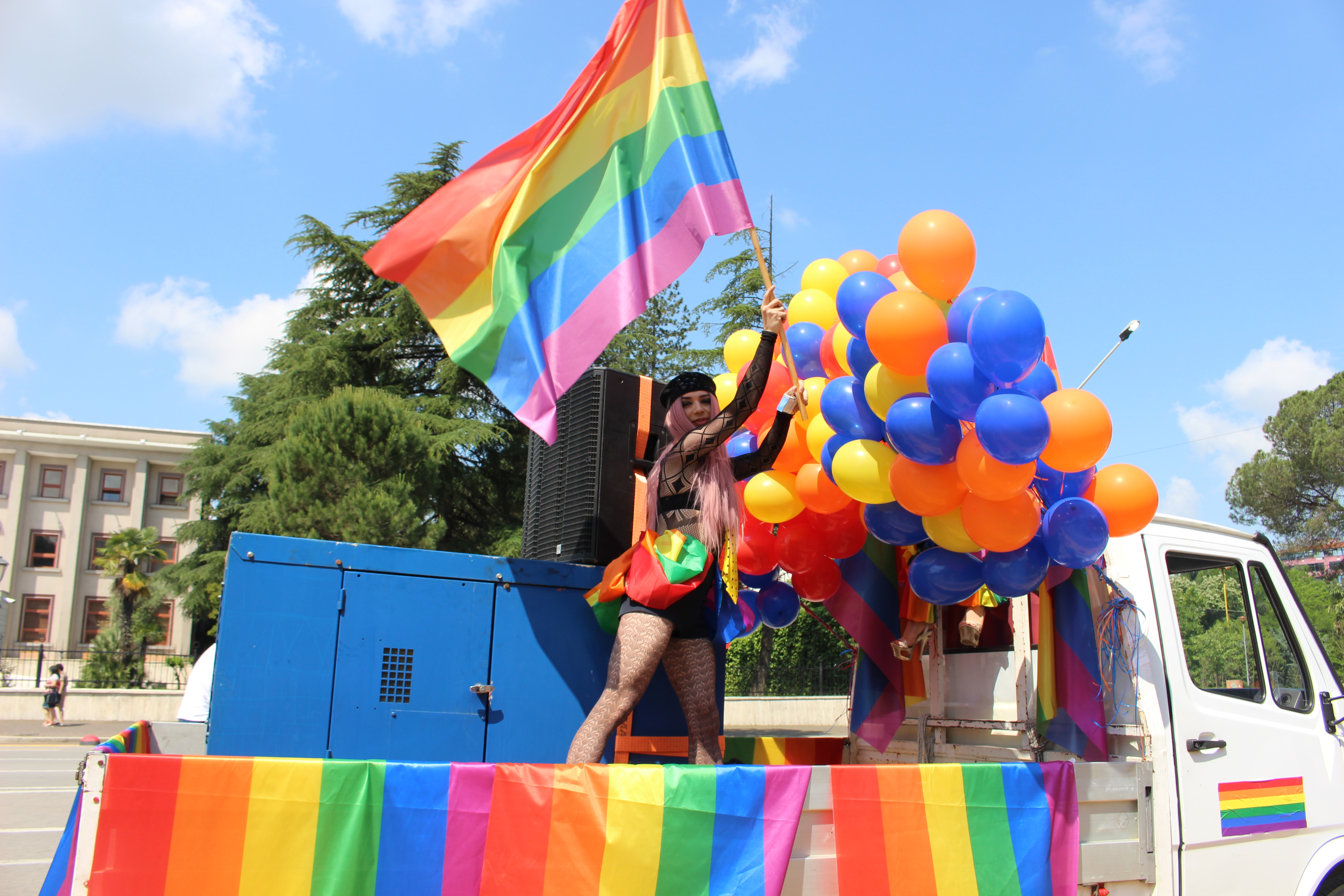
The 7th Gay Pride in Tirana

In June 2016, the government of Albania passed the National Action Plan for LGBTI that would address bullying and LGBT discrimation in primary and secondary education with lectures and other activities. The Albanian Ministry of Education, Sports and Youth expressed that in accordance to the plan, it would work with LGBT activists to fight discrimination on the ground of sexual orientation. The inclusion of LGBT issues in school activities created much controversy, with many political figures like Tritan Shehu, Luçiano Boçi, Mesila Doda, Nard Ndoka and Ylli Manjani expressing strong opposition to such activities.

In response to the controversy, the Ministry of Education and Sports issued a statement on 23 March 2018, stating that contrary to media reports, it was aware of these lectures and that they were conducted in the framework of the LGBTI National Action Plan which among other things aims to combat stereotypes based on sexual orientation. In a controversial statement, the director of Tirana high school "Sami Frasheri" Ms. Teuta Dobi publicly opposed such lectures, despite the fact that several weeks earlier LGBTI activists had given a lecture at her school with the approval of the school.

== LGBT rights movement in Albania ==
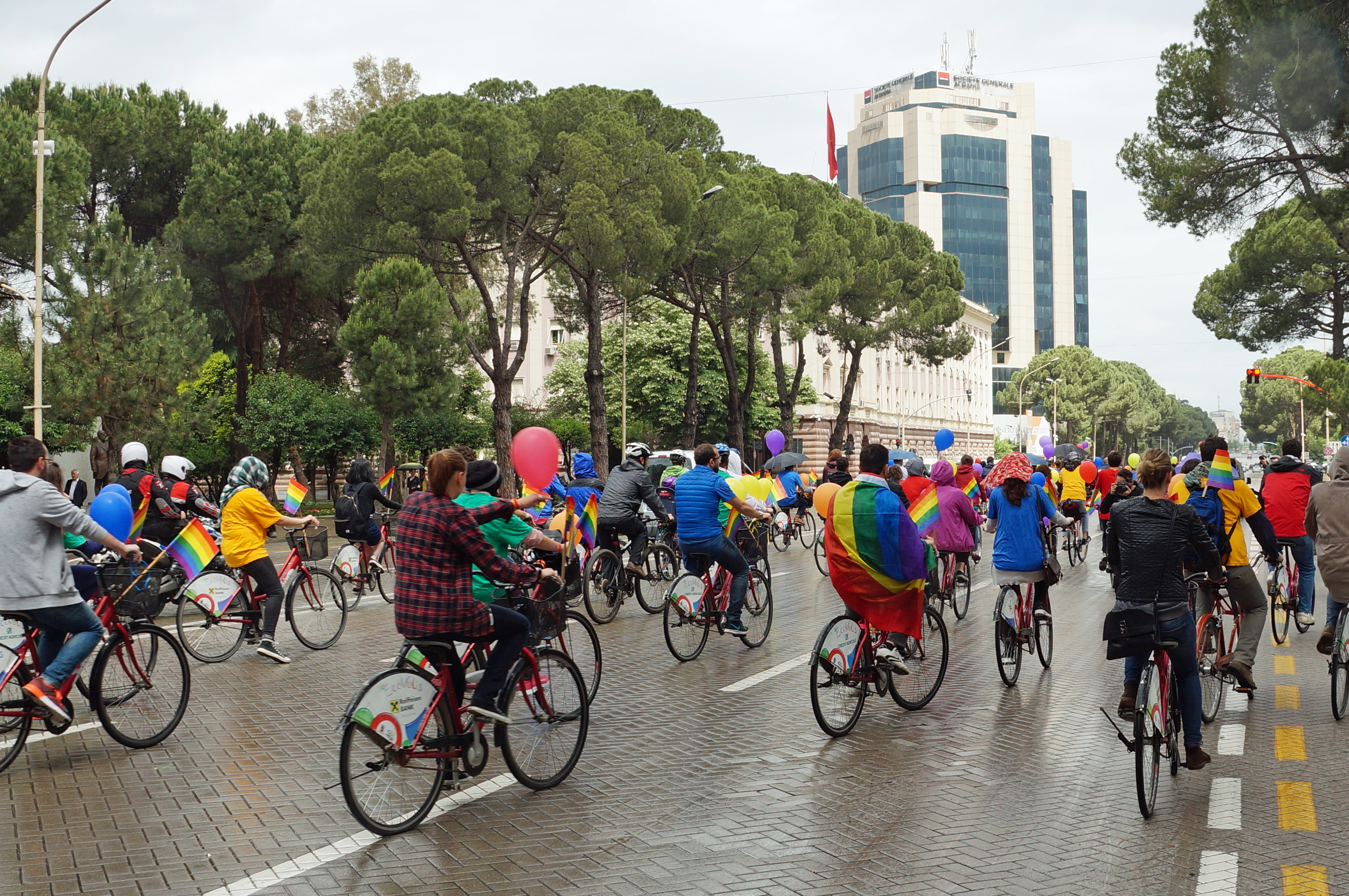
Gay Pride ride 2016 in Tirana

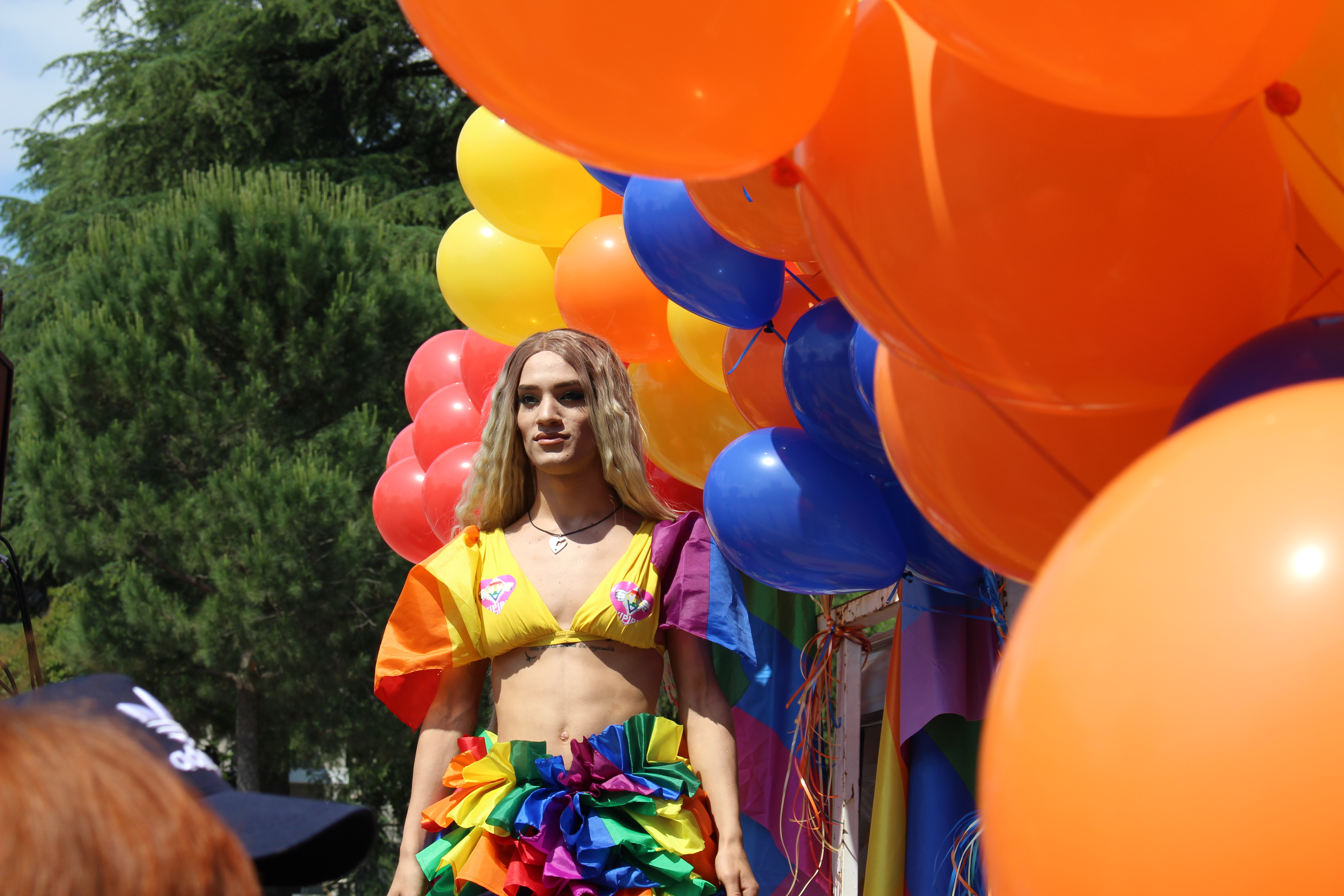
The 7th Gay Pride in Tirana

There are several organisations in Albanian focused on LGBT rights – the three best known are Aleanca Kunder Diskriminimit LGBT (Alliance Against LGBT Discrimination), Pro LGBT and Pink Embassy/LGBT PRO ne Shqiperi. These organizations work to create a better and more equal living situation for LGBT people in Albania.

The Alliance Against LGBT Discrimination (short form: Aleanca LGBT) is an Albanian non-governmental organization founded by five lesbians. It envisions a free, open and equal Albanian society that embraces diversity and is inclusive of people of all sexual orientations and gender identities. Aleanca LGBT was created in March, 2009 by a volunteer group of LGBT young people dedicated to improving life and empowering LGBT people in Albania. Aleanca's activities include: community building, awareness raising, advocacy and lobbying. Xheni Karaj, this NGO's current director, spoke in an Ankara meeting held in March 2013 as being the first out lesbian activist in Albania.

Pro LGBT is mainly focused on public awareness on LGBT issues and using advocacy as a tool to improve the situation of LGBT community. This organization co-funded by activist Kristi Pinderi who is a journalist in profession, launched in 2012 the human rights news portal "My Story" (historiaime.al), which has become the main source in Albania for LGBT issues.

In December 2010, the Deputy Commission for Labour, Social Affairs and Health, Tritan Shehu, declared that "homosexuality should be treated by medical staff as hormonal disorder, as well as psychological". The LGBT organizations filed a collective complaint with the Commissioner for Protection from Discrimination. The Commissioner reviewed the declarations and, after a lengthy delay, on 30 September 2011 reprimanded Shehu in a letter to Parliament: "Mr. Shehu should avoid discriminatory remarks in the future, which cause an atmosphere of tension and unfriendliness towards the LGBT community in Albania." The Commissioner further recommended that Parliament should grant "all guaranties so that the thoughts, opinions and remarks of the LGBT community are heard, evaluated and taken into consideration, when they are directly involved on specific topics, in order to help the community to enjoy fully its rights and freedoms".

In 2014 the first edition of Miss Trans Albania was held in Tirana, a beauty pageant competition for trans women in Albania, aiming to raise visibility and acceptance for the transgender community.

In April 2018, Erinda Ballanca, the current People's Advocate, came out in support of same-sex marriage and pledged to support LGBT rights including the right to legally change one's gender.

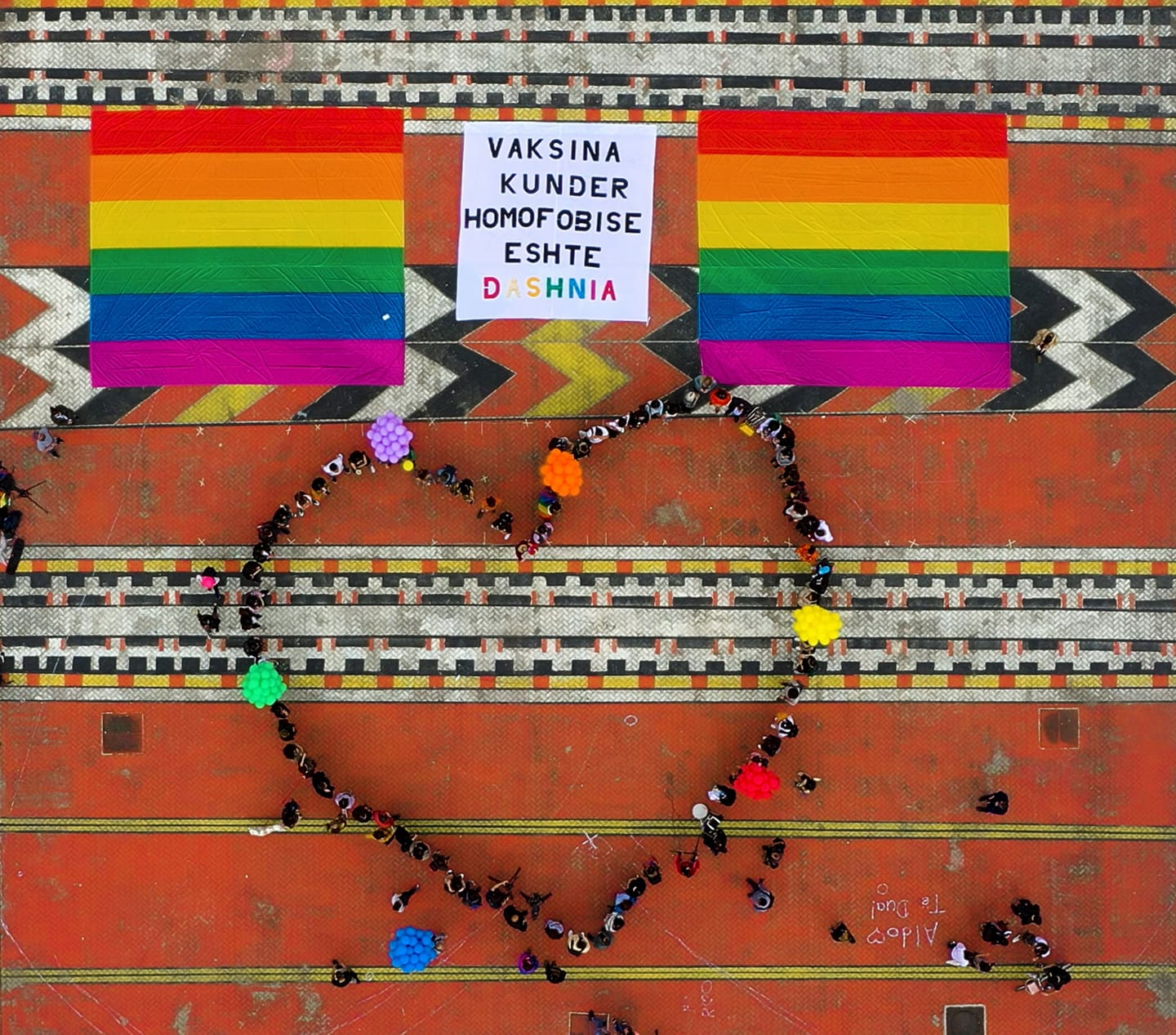
Flash mob action in 2021 to mark IDAHOT at Mother Theresa Square in Tirana. "Love is the vaccine against Homophobia"

=== Violence and discrimination in everyday life ===
In 2018 NGOs declared that there has, "Unfortunately, been stagnation and some deterioration in the respect of the rights of the LGBT+ community in our Albania."

According to the annual report of the organizations, by the end of 2018, there were 421 documented cases of discrimination against LGBTI members in Albania. The types of discrimination range from direct physical violence to psychological pressure such as insulting, ridiculing, labeling, malicious gossiping, humiliation on the street, not being offered services in bars, gyms, supermarkets, violent physical attacks by clients (sex workers), or on the street by homophobic persons. Out of all the cases reported, only five cases of violence were reported to authorities.

== Religion and LGBT people in Albania ==
Religion is not a major component of social, political and cultural life in Albania. Although religion is regarded as a private issue and is not part of political discourse, faith-based organizations have been trying to influence political decisions concerning the human rights of LGBTI people. On 19 August 2009, when ex-premier Berisha heralded a new law on anti-discrimination which would confer legal recognition and protection for the human rights of LGBTI people in Albania, religious organizations reacted en masse against the proposal. They wrote a letter to the government stating that they considered the extension of family rights to LGBTI people to be a threat to Albanian family and society. They considered homosexuality an imported habit from Western countries and urged the Prime Minister: "To do what is right in the eyes of God, and not what is right in the eyes of the modern world".

On 20 January 2016, the leaders of faith-based organizations, united to call upon the government and parliament to prohibit same-sex marriages to "protect the family from destruction". Under strong pressure from religious leaders, and contrary to promises that sexual orientation and gender identity would be included in the list of prohibited grounds for discrimination, members of parliament removed it from Article 18 of the Constitution at the last moment. On 20 July 2016, PINK Embassy published a press declaration criticizing the withdrawal of the constitutional amendments on discrimination on the grounds of sexual orientation and gender identity, and criticized members of parliament for capitulating to religious intolerance warning that: "The submission of parliament to religious extremism is a threat to secularism and human rights".

Studies on religion in the Western Balkans show that homosexuality is perceived to be a unifying enemy promoted by Western values. The more that sexual diversity is defended by the West, the more resistance may emerge against LGBTI people's human rights. There are no faith-based groups providing support to LGBTI people.

Following a 2024 declaration, the Orthodox Church of Albania was accused by ILGA-Europe of disseminating disinformation via "pro-family" groups, specifically regarding claims of "propaganda" and LGBTQ "infiltration" of schools. The Church's official position defined same-sex marriage as an "unnatural deviation" and a "foreign imposition" that contradicts the "natural order." Despite human rights organizations labeling such rhetoric as false, the Church maintained that legalizing same-sex marriage would result in "social catastrophes" and violate the "natural order" of the family.

== Organizations, online communities and news portals ==
- AleancaLGBT
- Historia Ime
- Streha
- Mendo politikisht
- Pro LGBT
- Gay.al

== Public opinion ==
Social attitudes towards the LGBT community are generally negative and are among the most unfavorable in Europe. Data released by the ESS in 2013 reveal that the vast majority of Albanians are socially conservative and disapprove of the gay and lesbian community. According to the survey data, 53% of Albanians believe that "gays and lesbians should not be free to live life as they wish," the largest percentage holding that opinion in the survey.

Results of previous polling by Gallup's Balkan Monitor taken in 2010 show that 54.2% of Albanians consider homosexual relations wrong, while 22.7% disagree. A regional difference was observed, as respondents from Central Albania were more likely to disagree (35.5% agree, 28.2% disagree) than those from the North (59.8% agree, 16.4% disagree) or the South (71.1% agree, 17.2% disagree). Additionally, Albanian respondents were more likely to disagree than those from most neighboring Balkan countries, including North Macedonia (69.4% to 18.4%), Serbia (75.1% to 8.7%), Montenegro (65.8% to 12.1%), Kosovo (64.9% to 18.5%) and Bosnia (74.3% to 9.2%), while Croatia was comparable (50.3% to 20.4%). Other questions asked included whether homosexuals were entitled to "the same rights as all other people", to which 44.4% of Albanians agreed while 28.5% disagreed. On the other hand, 78.7% of Albanians thought "homosexual acts" were immoral, 56.2% thought that homosexuals should not have public posts (like being a teacher, the question said) and a similar number of 56.1% said they should not show their preferences in public.

A 2015 study on the Albanian youth aged 16–27 found that 55% would not want to have homosexual neighbours, while 34% would not care and 11% would be positive about it.

A 2016 study detected that there were more manifestations of homophobia among Albanian university students than Italian university students, but less among the Albanian students than among Ukrainian university students. Among the Albanians, factors associated with homophobia included being male, being politically conservative, and being religious (although no difference was detected between Catholics and Muslims, while there were not many representatives of other groups except for atheists in the survey). On the other hand, being politically progressive and being in a relationship were associated with decreased detection of homophobia among Albanian students.

According to the results of a 2015 Balkan poll by the National Democratic Institute only 6% of the Albanians would support their child completely if they found out they there were LGBT and that figure drops to 3% if it was their friend/acquaintance/colleague. Also 8% had interacted with a person who they knew to be LGBT. In the same poll 58% of the Albanians also said they would not vote for a political party that supports LGBT rights.

In 2022, a nationwide questionnaire carried out ahead of IDAHOT, revealed low acceptance levels when it comes to interacting with LGBTI+ people in everyday lives. Less than 1 in 5 Albanians (16.4%) have had a social or professional relationship with someone from the LGBT+ community and only around 1 in 10 Albanians would accept someone from the LGBT community as a friend (12.5%), neighbor (14.3%), colleague (14.7%), boss (12.9%), or family doctor (9.3%). The difference between Albanians who live in rural areas with those living in urban areas, and between generations was small. Younger generations are just as refusing of the LGBT+ community as older generations.

== Summary table ==
Same-sex sexual activity legal	Yes (Since 1995)
Equal age of consent (14)	Yes (Since 2001)
Anti-discrimination laws in employment	Yes (Since 2010)
Anti-discrimination laws in the provision of goods and services	Yes (Since 2010)
Anti-discrimination laws in all other areas (incl. indirect discrimination, hate speech)	Yes (Since 2010)
Same-sex marriages	No
Recognition of same-sex couples	No
Adoption by single LGBT people	Yes
Step-child adoption by same-sex couples	No
Joint adoption by same-sex couples	No
LGBT allowed to serve openly in the military	Yes (Since 2008)
Right to change legal gender	No
Access to IVF for lesbians	No
Conversion therapy banned on minors	Yes (Since 2020)
Commercial surrogacy for gay male couples	No (Illegal for all couples regardless of sexual orientation)
MSMs allowed to donate blood	Yes

== See also ==
- Human rights in Albania
- LGBT rights in Europe
- Recognition of same-sex unions in Albania
- Same-sex union court cases
