= The Power of Children =

Coordinates: 39°48′39″N 86°9′27″W

The Power of Children: Making a Difference is a permanent exhibition at The Children's Museum of Indianapolis that focuses on the life stories of four children who had suffered hardship borne of prejudice — Anne Frank, Ruby Bridges, Ryan White, and Malala Yousafzai. The exhibit is accompanied by the annual Power of Children Awards recognizing local children in grades 6–11 who have made a significant contribution to the local community. The exhibit has received critical acclaim among Museology professionals and received a 2009 American Association for State and Local History "award of merit".

== Exhibit ==
Established in 2007, and targeting children aged 10–14, it "provides a safe place for families and students to explore issues of intolerance, fear, and prejudice and related historical artifacts as experienced in the lives of three children Anne Frank, Ryan White, and Ruby Bridges." Respectively, these case studies allow children to learn about the Holocaust, AIDS, and racial segregation illustrated by the experiences of the children. In September 2021, the exhibit was expanded with a new section dedicated to Malala Yousafzai. This expansion allowed children to learn about Yousafzai's life, as well as the broader topic of human rights under the Taliban regime. The use of artifacts and immersive exhibit design (including, among other things a complete recreation of Ryan's bedroom), allow children to imagine themselves in the situation that each of the famous children faced. "[t]he stories of ordinary children in history can inspire young people today to fight prejudice and discrimination and make a positive difference in the world".

The exhibit uses the museum theater technique of first-person interpretation to make an interactive experience. Closing off a section of the exhibition space and inviting the audience to immerse themselves in the setting (in the case of the Ruby Bridges portion - by sitting in a replica classroom), an adult actor makes a 10–15 minute performance using props and some interaction. The quality of execution and educational effectiveness of this part of the exhibition has drawn particular praise from museum theorists as it "...integrate[s] live theater experiences into exhibition spaces, more naturally connecting visitors to important objects and stories".

In 2010 Elton John performed a benefit concert in Indianapolis to support the exhibit. The Elton John AIDS Foundation was founded in honor of Ryan White.

== Awards ==
Predating the development of the permanent exhibition, the Power of Children Awards are given annually to between four and six recipients, presented at a gala dinner attended by local dignitaries, the runners-up and winners' families and the museum's executive. The awards aims to "recognize Indiana youths who have made a significant impact on the lives of others, demonstrated selflessness, and exhibited a commitment to service and the betterment of society". Each award includes: a $2000 grant to continue the project; a four-year scholarship to either the University of Indianapolis or IUPUI; a short showcase video on local television station WISH-TV; and a display panel within the Power of Children exhibition.

=== Recipients ===
- 2013: Christopher Yao, Maria Keller, Alexandra Skinner, Makenzie Smith, Charles Orgbon III, Madeline Cumbey
- 2012: Grace Li, Nicholas Clifford, Neha Gupta, Timothy Balz, Sarah Wood
- 2011: Elizabeth Neimic, Nathaniel Montgomery Osborne VI, Jill Osterhus, Krystal Shirrell.
- 2010: Ashley Slayton, Jordyn Bever, Jared Brown, Kaylin Fanta, Benjamin Gormley, Claire Helmen.
- 2009: Kaylee Shirrell, Jacob Baldwin, Dale Pedzinski, Carah Austin, Amber Kriech, Olivia Rusk.
- 2008: Kyle Gough, Amanda & Grant Mansard, Alison Mansfield.
- 2007: Weston Luzadder, Keegan McCarthy, Evanne Offenbacker, Brittany Oliver, Brandon Taylor
- 2006: Shelby Mitchell, Sarah Boesing, Riley Curry, Matt Ciulla.
- 2005: Nikieia Fitzpatrick, Daniel Kent, Ashlee Hammer, Abraxas Segundo.
