= The Holy Virgin Mary =

Painting by Chris Ofili

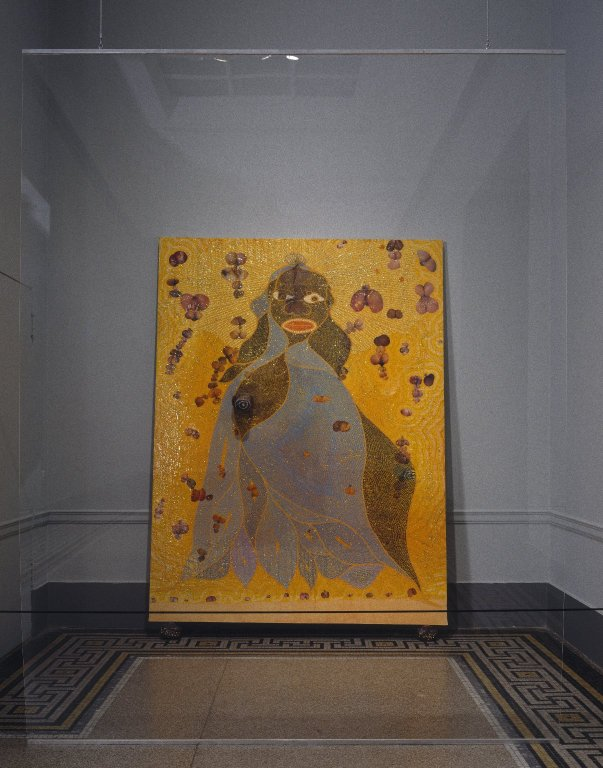
- The painting on display behind a protective screen at the Sensation exhibition at the Brooklyn Museum in 1999–2000
- Artist: Chris Ofili
- Year: 1996
- Medium: Mixed media
- Subject: The Virgin Mary
- Dimensions: 240 cm × 180 cm (96 in × 72 in)
- Location: Museum of Modern Art, New York City

The Holy Virgin Mary is a mixed media painting created by Chris Ofili in 1996 that utilizes elephant dung and naked imagery. It was one of the works included in the Sensation exhibition in London, Berlin and New York in 1997–2000. The subject of the work, and its execution, caused considerable controversy in New York, with Rudy Giuliani – then Mayor of New York City – describing Ofili's work as "sick". In 1998, Ofili was the first black artist to be awarded the Turner Prize. The painting was sold for £2.9 million in June 2015, and was gifted to the Museum of Modern Art in New York City in 2018. Chris Ofili’s use of elephant dung and cut-out images from pornographic magazines in the composition was widely interpreted by some religious groups as blasphemous and disrespectful. Catholic organizations in New York protested the exhibition of the work at the Brooklyn Museum in 1999, arguing that it constituted an attack on religious beliefs.

== Description ==
On a yellow-orange background, the large painting (8 feet high and 6 feet wide) depicts a black woman wearing a blue robe, a traditional attribute of the Virgin Mary. The work employs mixed media, including oil paint, glitter, and polyester resin, and also elephant dung, map pins and collaged pornographic images. The central Black Madonna is surrounded by many collaged images that resemble butterflies at first sight, but on closer inspection are photographs of female genitalia; an ironic reference to the putti that appear in traditional religious art. A lump of dried, varnished elephant dung forms one bared breast, and the painting is displayed leaning against the gallery wall, supported by two other lumps of elephant dung, decorated with coloured pins: the pins on the left are arranged to spell out "Virgin" and the one on the right "Mary". Many other works by Ofili in this period – including No Woman No Cry – incorporate elephant dung, particularly as supports for the canvas, inspired by a period that Ofili spent in Zimbabwe.

Ofili has described his confusion, as an altar boy, at the idea of the Virgin Mary giving birth, and has described his painting as a hip hop version of traditional Old Master paintings of the Virgin Mary. He has also emphasized the importance of the work depicting a Black Madonna.

== Reception ==
The painting was made in 1996 and it was bought by Charles Saatchi that year. It was included in the Sensation exhibition in London in 1997 and Berlin in 1998.

The mixture of the sacred (Virgin Mary) and the profane (excrement and pornography) became a cause of controversy when the Sensation exhibition moved to New York in 1999. The City of New York and Mayor Rudolph Giuliani brought a court case against the Brooklyn Museum, with Giuliani describing the exhibition of Ofili's work as "sick" and "disgusting". Giuliani attempted to withdraw the annual $7 million City Hall grant from the museum, and threatened it with eviction. The museum resisted Giuliani's demands, and its director, Arnold L. Lehman, filed a federal lawsuit against Giuliani for a breach of the First Amendment. The museum eventually won the court case.

Giuliani was reported as claiming that Ofili had thrown elephant dung at a painting of the Virgin Mary: "The idea of having so-called works of art in which people are throwing elephant dung at a picture of the Virgin Mary is sick." The press also reported that the painting was "smeared", "splattered" or "stained" with dung. Ofili, raised as a Roman Catholic, commented that "elephant dung in itself is quite a beautiful object."

The work was protected by a plexiglass screen, but was damaged when Dennis Heiner smeared white paint over the canvas on 16 December 1999. Heiner was charged with second-degree criminal mischief, and received a conditional discharge and a $250 fine. Scott LoBaido, an artist from Staten Island, was arrested on 30 September 1999 for throwing horse manure at the museum. He accused Chris Ofili's work of "Catholic bashing". Museum guards protecting the painting were quoted as saying: "It's not the Virgin Mary. It's a painting."

A planned exhibition at the National Gallery of Australia in Canberra in 2000 was cancelled after the US controversy.

The painting was bought by Australian art collector David Walsh in 2007. It was included in Ofili's mid-career retrospective at Tate Britain in 2010. From 2011, it was exhibited at Walsh's Museum of Old and New Art (MONA) in Hobart, Tasmania, the largest private art museum in the Southern Hemisphere.

It was sold at auction by Christie's in London on 30 June 2015, realizing a hammer price of £2,882,500, an auction record for the artist. Steven and Alexandra Cohen gifted the painting to the Museum of Modern Art in New York City in 2018.

== Provenance ==
Following is the record of ownership (provenance) of Ofili's painting showing owners of the painting as well as the gallery and auction house that sold it.

- Victoria Miro Gallery, London, 1996.
- Charles Saatchi, London, 1996–2007 (acquired from the above).
- David Walsh, Hobart, Australia, 2007–2015 (acquired from the above).
- Christie's, London, 30 June 2015. Sold for £2.9 million ($4.6million).
- Steven and Alexandra Cohen, Connecticut, ?–2018.
- Museum of Modern Art, New York City, 2018 onward (acquired by gift from the above).
