= Kristi Pinderi =

LGBTQ activist (b. 1982)

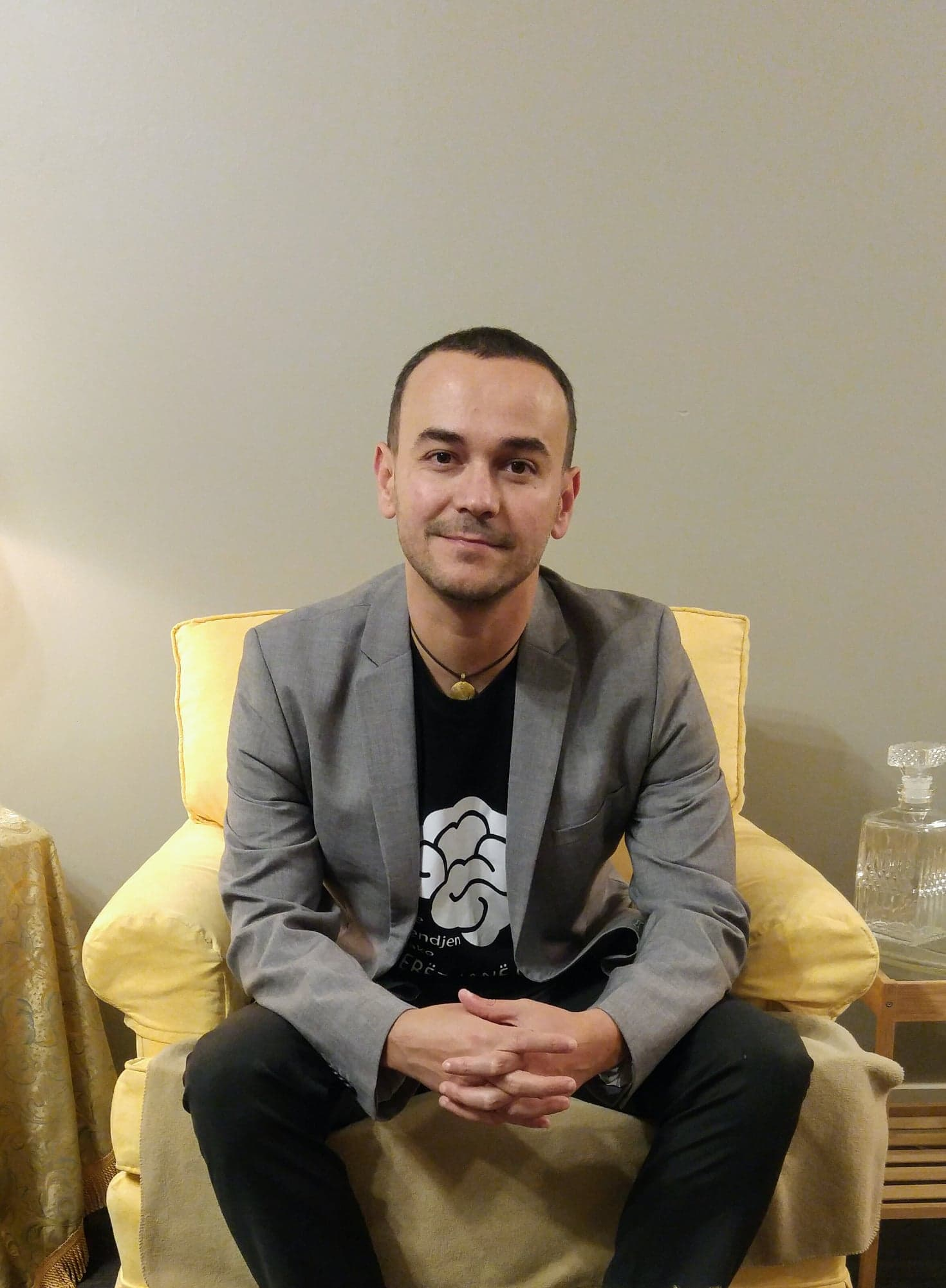
- Kristi Pinderi, Albanian activist for LGBTI+ rights
- Born: Korçë, Albania
- Education: BSW and MSW, University of British Columbia
- Occupations: Social worker, LGBT rights activist
- Known for: Co-founder of Pro LGBT; organizer of Albania's first LGBT Pride Parade
- Movement: LGBT rights in Albania; human rights activism

Kristi Pinderi is an Albanian activist advocating for the LGBT community rights, a former journalist and a social worker resident in Canada. He is the founder of the Pro-LGBT organization in Albania.

== Political activism ==
Kristi Pinderi, known in Albania as an LGBT rights activist, has fled Albania, and lives in Canada. He came out to his family at the age of 27.

In March 2012, he established Pro-LGBT, an organisation that works mainly to raise awareness about LGBTQ topics. In May of that year, along with 8 other activists he pedaled at the Dëshmorët e Kombit Boulevard in Tirana in what was called the first pride event in Albania.

During the parliamentary elections of 2013, Pinderi, together with activist Xheni Karaj, developed for the first time a series of consultations with key political parties to include LGBTQ rights reference in their programs. In the framework of that initiative, Pinderi and Karaj had the opportunity to meet with former Prime Minister Sali Berisha and with his challenger Socialist Party leader Edi Rama. As a result of these lobbying efforts, Albania adopted in 2016 a National Action Plan for LGBTI people, a plan that was welcomed by the former Albanian Ombudsman Igli Totozani. In December 2014, Pinderi was a co-founder of the STREHA, a residential shelter assisting homeless LGBTQ youth, the first such center throughout South East Europe, supported by USAID, the British Embassy in Tirana and the British organization Albert Kennedy Trust.

In May 2015, along with Karaj, he produced a long-featured documentary entitled SkaNdal, directed by Elton Baxhaku and Eriona Camit. The documentary was about the history of the LGBTQ movement and it featured at several international film festivals, such as at the Sarajevo Film Festival, at DokuFest in Prizren, etc.

In his years of activism, Pinderi is known for several heated debates in the media with politicians, and with figures from the art and culture environment, with journalists, as well as for some long lasting controversial media debates with former Albanian MP Mesila Doda (an opponent of same-sex marriages, compared by Pinderi as an Albanian Anita Bryant) or with the singer Eneda Tarifa, whom he publicly called a homophobic person after she made some controversial comments when singer Conchita Wurst won the Eurovision Song Contest in 2014, with actor Julian Deda, with journalist Enkel Demi, etc.

In June 2019, while studying at Langara College, he started working with LGBTQ+ newcomers in Surrey, British Columbia. In Canada he is often invited to speak as an advocate for refugees. In an event organized by University of British Columbia, where he studied in the School of Social Work he spoke about borders and how they can be reimagined in a more human-centered way.

In 2021 Pinderi was a finalist of the 13th annual Top 25 Canadian Immigrant Awards, a national awards program presented by Canadian Immigrant magazine, and awarded annually to 25 inspirational immigrants, who have made a difference to Canada.

== 1997 ==
In January 2020 he published his memoir entitled "1997", a publication supported by the European Union. During the promotion of the book, feminist activists Xheni Karaj and Gresa Hasa lead a discussion focusing especially on the disclosure in the book of intimate events experienced by Pinderi, such as sexual assaults and repeated violence during his adolescence in Pogradec. The book is considered the first memoir written by an openly gay man in Albania, and the first publication by an Albanian author that deals with issues such as sexual violence, and child abuse.

== Personal life ==
At the end of May 2017, Pinderi left Albania due to the many threats, a year after the death of his mother, Liljana Priftuli, who publicly supported him. Dailyxtra, a Canadian queer outlet, published a long article of Pinderi detailing the reasons that forced him to go to Canada, together with his partner, Erjon Tela, also one of the first LGBTQ rights activists in Albania.

In October 2026, Pinderi announced that he and his partner were expecting their first child, a daughter named Lili, through gestational surrogacy in Canada.
