= Doreen Lawrence =

British-Jamaican campaigner (born 1952)

The Right Honourable The Baroness Lawrence of Clarendon OBE
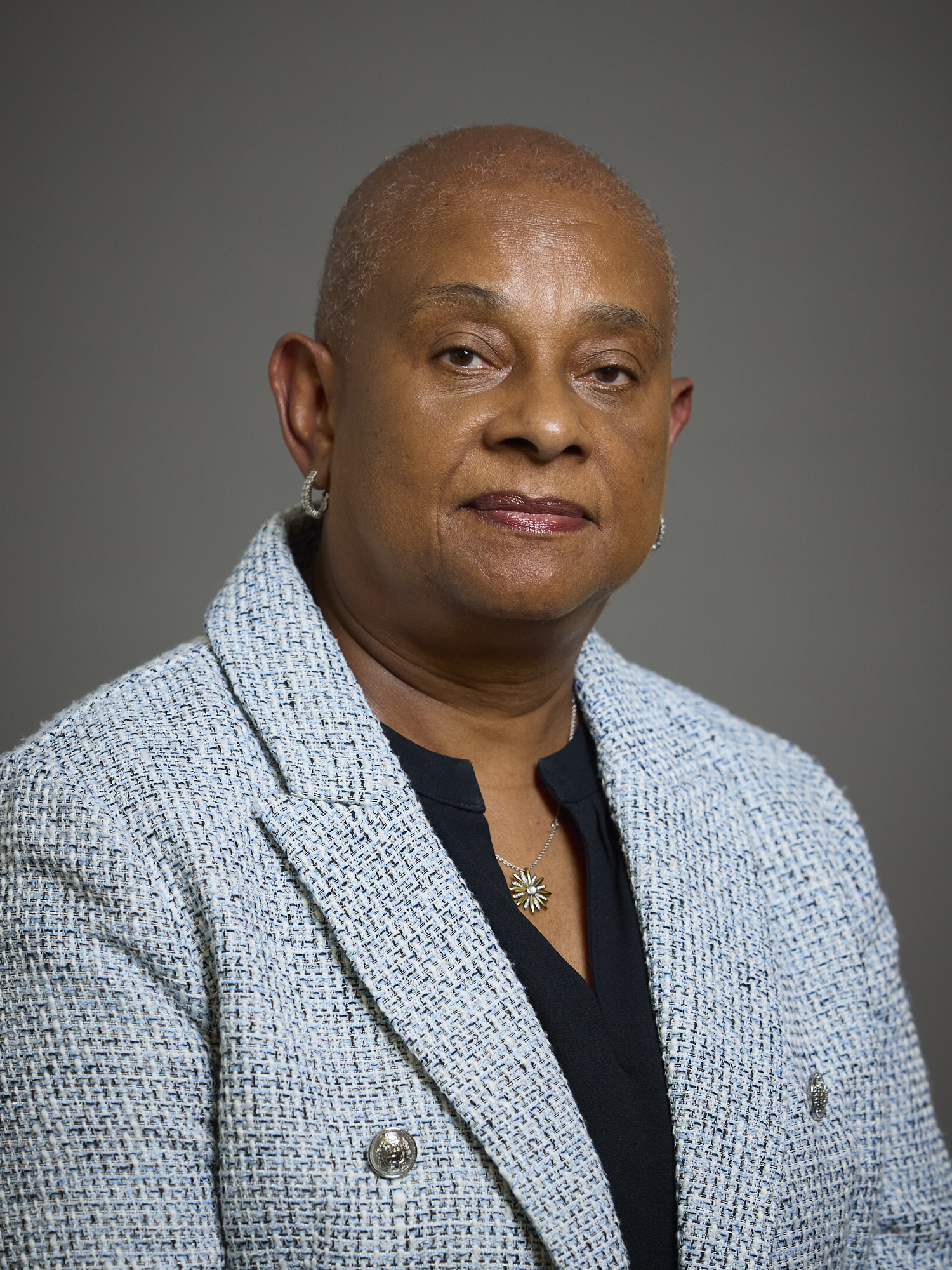
- Official portrait, 2025

Member of the House of Lords
- Lord Temporal
- Life peerage 6 September 2013

Chancellor of De Montfort University
- In office 22 January 2016 – 31 January 2020
- Vice-Chancellor: Dominic Shellard; Andy Collop (interim)
- Preceded by: Waheed Alli
- Succeeded by: Akram Khan

Personal details
- Born: Doreen Delceita Graham; 24 October 1952 (age 74) Clarendon, Colony of Jamaica
- Party: Labour
- Spouse: Neville Lawrence (m. 1972; div. 1999)
- Children: 3, including Stephen Lawrence
- Education: University of Greenwich
- Occupation: Campaigner
- Lawrence's voice from the BBC programme Desert Island Discs, 10 June 2012.

Doreen Delceita Lawrence, Baroness Lawrence of Clarendon (née Graham; born 24 October 1952), is a British Jamaican campaigner and the mother of Stephen Lawrence, a black British teenager who was murdered in a racist attack in South East London in 1993. She promoted reforms of the police service and founded the Stephen Lawrence Charitable Trust. Lawrence was appointed Officer of the Order of the British Empire (OBE) for services to community relations in 2003, and was created a life peer in 2013.

On the first national Stephen Lawrence Day on 22 April 2019, she described how she had worked for 26 years hoping for "an inclusive society for everyone to live their best life, regardless of gender, race, sexuality, religion, disability or background".

== Early and personal life ==
Lawrence was born in Clarendon, Jamaica, in 1952. At the age of nine, she emigrated to the United Kingdom. She completed her education in south-east London, before becoming a bank worker. In 1972, she married Neville Lawrence. Together they had three children: Stephen (13 September 1974 – 22 April 1993); Stuart, born in 1977; and Georgina, born in 1982. The couple divorced in 1999.

== Murder of Stephen Lawrence ==
Following the murder of their son Stephen in 1993, Doreen and Neville Lawrence claimed that the Metropolitan Police investigation was not being conducted in a professional manner, citing incompetence and racism as prime flaws. In 1994 the Lawrences initiated a private prosecution of five of the suspects, but the evidence was insufficient, resulting in their acquittal, and no prospect of subsequent conviction due to the double jeopardy law. In 1999, after years of campaigning, and with the support of many in the community, the media and politics, a wide-ranging judicial inquiry was established by Jack Straw, the Home Secretary. Chaired by Sir William MacPherson, the inquiry was to investigate the circumstances of Stephen Lawrence's death. The public inquiry was the subject of intense media interest, which became international when it concluded that the Metropolitan Police was "institutionally racist." The report also recommended changes in the double jeopardy law, which were passed in 2003 and came into effect in 2005. In 2010, after a review of the forensic and other evidence started in 2006, two of the murderers were re-arrested and tried and found guilty in 2011-12.

== Public life ==
In the aftermath of the inquiry, Lawrence continued to campaign for justice for her son as well as for other victims of racist crime. She has worked to secure further reforms of the police service. In 2003, she was appointed OBE for services to community relations.

Lawrence founded the Stephen Lawrence Charitable Trust to promote a positive community legacy in her son's name. She has been selected to sit on panels within the Home Office and the police, and she is a member of both the board and the council of Liberty, the human rights organisation, as well as being a patron of hate crime charity Stop Hate UK.

In 1998, Lawrence worked with the Royal Institute of British Architects and the Marco Goldschmied Foundation to establish the Stephen Lawrence Prize, an annual prize and bursary for younger architects.

In August 2014, Lawrence was one of 200 public figures who were signatories to a letter to The Guardian opposing Scottish independence in the run-up to September's referendum on that issue.

In April 2020, Lawrence was appointed as race relations advisor to the Labour Party.

in June 2026, Lawrence criticised Hampshire Police for their response to the murder of Henry Nowak, a British-Polish university student stabbed by a Sikh with a religious blade. She also criticised Kemi Badenoch, leader of the Conservative Party, for her comments on the case.

In July 2026, Lawrence was among seven well-known figures who lost a High Court privacy case against Associated Newspapers, the publisher of the Daily Mail and The Mail on Sunday. She had alleged that five articles relied on information "stolen" about her and the investigation into her son's murder.

=== Controversy ===
In October 2019, Lawrence attracted criticism for her on-camera remarks concerning the Grenfell Tower fire tragedy made during an interview with Channel 4 News. She was quoted as saying: "Had that been a block full of white people in there, they would have done everything to get them out as fast as possible and make sure that they do what they needed to do." A public petition was raised demanding an apology. She later apologised for her remarks.

== Recognition ==
On 27 July 2012, Lawrence took part in the 2012 Summer Olympics opening ceremony, holding the Olympic flag with seven others.

In October 2012, Lawrence received a Lifetime Achievement Award at the 14th Pride of Britain Awards.

In April 2014, Lawrence was named as Britain's most influential woman in the BBC Radio 4's Woman's Hour Power List 2014.

In May 2014, Lawrence was awarded the Grassroot Diplomat Initiative Award under the Social Driver category for her extensive work with the Stephen Lawrence Charitable Trust.

Lawrence was elevated to the peerage as a life peer on 6 September 2013, as Baroness Lawrence of Clarendon, of Clarendon in the Commonwealth Realm of Jamaica; the honour is rare for being designated after a location in a Commonwealth realm outside the United Kingdom. She sits on the Labour benches in the House of Lords as a working peer.

Lawrence has been awarded honorary doctorates from the University of Cambridge, the Open University, the University of West London, and The University of Law. She served as Chancellor of De Montfort University, Leicester, from 2016 to 2020. She is an Honorary Fellow of Murray Edwards College, Cambridge.

Lawrence was the guest "castaway" on BBC Radio 4's Desert Island Discs on 10 June 2012.

Chris Ofili's 1998 painting No Woman No Cry is a portrait of Lawrence crying; in each tear is an image of her son Stephen. It was part of Ofili's Turner Prize exhibition, and now hangs in the Tate Gallery.

== In popular culture ==
In 1999, Lawrence was portrayed by actress Marianne Jean-Baptiste in the ITV docudrama The Murder of Stephen Lawrence. In 2000, Lawrence was featured in a double portrait exhibited at the Stephen Lawrence Gallery in Greenwich, London.

Sons of Kemet dedicated the album Your Queen Is a Reptile to Lawrence among others.

== See also ==
- Lucy McBath
