= Ermir =

Ermir is an Albanian masculine given name. It is a combination of Albanian words: erë (wind) and mirë (good). Notable people with the name include:

- Ermir Dobjani (born 1953), Albanian lawyer
- Ermir Lenjani (born 1989), Albanian footballer
- Ermir Rashica (born 2004), footballer
- Ermir Rezi (born 1994), Albanian footballer
- Ermir Strati (born 1983), Albanian footballer
