= Dominic Shellard =

British academic

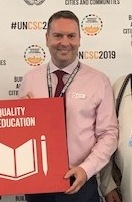
- Shellard at The United Nations Civil Society Conference in August 2019

Vice-Chancellor of De Montfort University
- In office June 2010 – February 2019
- Chancellor: The Lord Alli; The Baroness Lawrence of Clarendon
- Preceded by: Philip Tasker
- Succeeded by: Andy Collop (interim)

Rotherham Metropolitan Borough Councillor for Boston Ward
- In office 1999–2003

Personal details
- Born: Orpington, Greater London
- Education: St Peter's College, Oxford

Dominic Shellard is a British academic who has served as head of the School of English and pro-vice-chancellor at the University of Sheffield and vice-chancellor of De Montfort University. A former Rotherham councillor, he is a recipient of the Mahatma Gandhi Seva Medal, awarded by the United Nations NGO, the Gandhi Global Family, for his 'social good work' in the UK and India.

== Early life ==
Dominic Shellard was born in Orpington, Greater London, in 1966. He went to school at Crofton Junior School and then the private Dulwich College, before going on to read English and German at St Peter's College, Oxford, where he also obtained a DPhil in English literature on the theatre criticism of Harold Hobson.

He is a former Labour Party councillor for Boston Ward on Rotherham Metropolitan Borough Council, serving from 1999 until 2003.

== Academic career ==
Shellard began his academic career as a lecturer in English at the University of Salford in 1993. He moved to the University of Sheffield in 1996, and was awarded a Readership in 1999 and a Personal Chair in 2003. In 2004, he became the Head of the Department of English, before being appointed Pro Vice-Chancellor for External Affairs in 2008.

He served as Vice-Chancellor of De Montfort University (DMU) in Leicester from 2010-2019.

Shellard is an expert in post-war British theatre and an active Shakespeare scholar. He has authored ten books, including British Theatre Since The War, (Yale University Press, 1999), Shakespeare: A Writer’s Life (British Library/Oxford University Press, 2000), and a biography of the critic Kenneth Tynan, Kenneth Tynan: A Life (Yale University Press, 2003) with the most recent monograph being Shakespeare's Culture Capital, which he edited with Siobhan Keenan in 2016. He also founded and led the Theatre Archive Project, a joint venture with the British Library to reinvestigate British theatre history from 1945 to 1968. The Theatre Archive Project contains a very large number of interviews with practitioners, actors, playwrights and audience members about this formative period of British Theatre history. Shellard is also a former chairman of Sheffield Theatres Trust, responsible for the Crucible Theatre and the Lyceum Theatre.

== Square Mile India ==
During his time as Vice-Chancellor Shellard conceived and oversaw the launch of Square Mile India, an initiative created to "help improve the lives of thousands of India’s poorest and most vulnerable families". To do this, students from the university would travel to Ahmedebad, Gujarat, to work with the community in the city’s largest slum, home to 160,000 people. Whilst they were there, the students focussed on improving the infrastructure of the slum sustainably, by introducing the use of solar power and intelligent electricity systems to ensure energy would be used efficiently. They also worked closely with these communities to "help people needing treatment for eyesight and hearing problems, and to use art, education and psychology training to improve community life", as well as building homes for families affected by leprosy, work on projects to improve sanitation, design anti-microbial pillows for children to sleep on and help improve literacy and numeracy skills.

In 2013, the Gandhi Global Family, a United Nations NGO, presented Prof Shellard with the Mahatma Gandhi Seva Medal for services to society. As a result of the university’s commitment to social good, its efforts were recognised by Mahatma Gandhi’s grandson in a visit to the campus later that year. In 2017, Shellard was appointed special representative to the United Nations Civil Society Unit for the Gandhi Global Family and in August 2019, he delivered an address, together with Baroness Doreen Lawrence of Clarendon and Padmashri Dr S. P. Varma, the Vice-President of the Gandhi Global Family, on his 'social good work' in India to the 68th United Nations Civil Society Conference in Salt Lake City, Utah. In November 2019, Shellard initiated new 'social good' projects in the Union Territory of Jammu and Kashmir.

== The royal visit to De Montfort University ==
The very first visit of Her Majesty, Queen Elizabeth’s, Diamond Jubilee tour in 2012 was to De Montfort University. The Queen was accompanied by Prince Philip and the Duchess of Cambridge. Hosted by Lord Waheed Alli, De Montfort University put on a fashion show for the Queen. The Queen also met with the university’s Bollywood Dance Society.

== Charity work ==
Shellard conducted charity activity whilst working at De Montfort University. This included a 'Holding out for a Hero' flash mob which took place on 7 November 2012, raising £5,000 for a local hospice and prostate cancer charity. The video though, cost £22,000 to stage and due to the discrepancy between the cost and the money raised was criticised by some media.

== International work ==
During Shellard's term in office DMU also founded the DMU Global scheme, an international student mobility project, which enabled DMU students to travel abroad to destinations such as the United Nations in New York and refugee centres in Berlin.

== Campus transformation of DMU ==
During Shellard's term in office De Montfort University developed a new campus, following a £136m investment in facilities for students. The new campus included the new Queen Elizabeth II Diamond Jubilee Leisure Centre, a new complex for the Faculty of Art and Design, the Vijay Patel Building, a conference centre, a new sportsground and a new ‘green lung’, a large series of landscaped open spaces at the heart of the university.

== Pay and benefits ==
In January 2019, Shellard came under public scrutiny regarding a 22.3 per cent increase in his remuneration over that of the previous year, following the award to DMU of TEF Gold status for the university. His remuneration for the academic year 2017-18 consisted of a £350,000 salary (2016–17; £286,000), £1,000 in health benefits, and £6,000 in pension contributions. Other benefits included Ivy Club membership.

In 2018 it emerged that Shellard had business links with the Chair of The Remuneration Committee of the Board of Governors who had awarded him a £64,000 pay rise. Shellard was paid an additional £270,000, the equivalent of 9 months pay, when he resigned from the university in 2019. The Office for Students launched a formal investigation of De Montfort University following the resignation; the report concluded that there had been serious failings in governance, including oversight of The Vice-Chancellor.

== Business interests ==
Shellard established a series of companies including Theseus Global Limited, Theseus Global (Education) Limited, and Acetute Limited. Each of these companies has now been dissolved.

Dominic is listed as an executive coach for Ride The Wave Training Limited. A company partly owned by his sister, Sonya Shellard.

== Personal life ==
Shellard was one of the very few openly gay Vice-Chancellors. He is also a fan of Queens Park Rangers football club.
