= Waheed Alli, Baron Alli =

British media entrepreneur (born 1964)

The Right Honourable The Lord Alli of Norbury
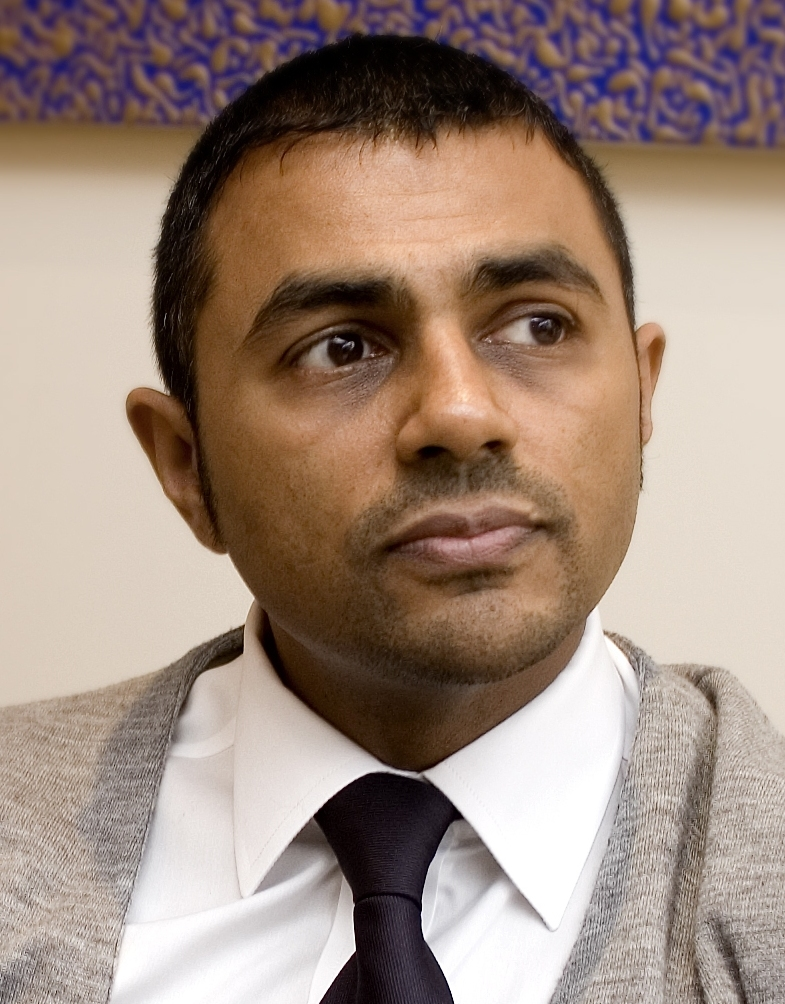
- Lord Alli in 2010

Chancellor of De Montfort University
- In office 2006–2015
- Vice-Chancellor: Philip Tasker; Dominic Shellard
- Preceded by: The Baroness Prashar
- Succeeded by: The Baroness Lawrence

Member of the House of Lords
- Lord Temporal
- Life peerage 18 July 1998

Personal details
- Born: Waheed Alli; 16 November 1964 (age 61) Croydon, Surrey, England
- Party: Labour
- Profession: Media entrepreneur

Waheed Alli, Baron Alli of Norbury (born 16 November 1964) is a British media entrepreneur and politician. He has held executive positions at several television production companies including the Endemol Shine Group, Carlton Television Productions (now ITV Studios), Planet 24, and Chorion. Alli served as the chief executive of Silvergate Media until 2022, chairman of Koovs plc and a director at Olga Productions. He is a member of the House of Lords in the United Kingdom, sitting as a life peer for the Labour Party, and is described as one of only a few openly gay Muslim politicians in the world.

== Early life ==
Alli's mother, a nurse, is an Indo-Trinidadian from Trinidad and Tobago, and his estranged father, a mechanic, is an Indo-Guyanese from Guyana. His mother was Hindu and his father Muslim; he has two brothers, one Hindu and the other Muslim.

Alli attended Stanley Technical College in South Norwood and left school at 16 with nine O-levels.

== Business career ==
Alli started work as a junior researcher for a finance magazine, crediting his first success to Salem Ghayar, who hired and mentored him. After a few years of preparing monthly reports for potential investors, he was headhunted by Save & Prosper, part of Robert Fleming & Co. Eventually he returned to his original employer, and worked his way up in the media business within Robert Maxwell's stable of publications.

He then went to the City for a second career in investment banking, through which he became wealthy. In the mid-1980s he met Charlie Parsons, who was to become his business partner as well as his life partner.

Alli's third career, and the first in which he achieved public prominence, was in the television industry. He and Parsons set up 24 Hour Productions, which produced The Word, "the most talked about television programme in Britain". In 1992 they merged with Bob Geldof's Planet Pictures to form Planet 24. Such was its success that it became one of the largest TV production companies in the country, and the main independent supplier to Channel 4. It was responsible for genre-breaking programmes such as Big Breakfast and Survivor. Carlton Television bought Planet 24 in March 1999 for £15 million, with Alli and Parsons retaining the rights to the lucrative Survivor format. Waheed Alli became a Carlton board director before stepping down a year later.

In April 2003, Alli took over as chairman of the media rights company Chorion Ltd, which owns rights to Enid Blyton and Agatha Christie, and has offices beyond the UK in New York, Sydney, and Tokyo. He was chairman of AIM-listed ASOS.com and a director of Olga Television, entertainer Paul O'Grady's production company. He also backed Shine Limited, Elisabeth Murdoch's media production company, which she later sold to 21st Century Fox (owned by her father Rupert Murdoch) for £211 million. In August 2011, he stepped down from the chairmanship of Chorion, selling half his stake in ASOS.com the next month for £14.25 million. The sale helped to finance Alli's new company, Silvergate Media, and its purchase of the rights to Beatrix Potter and Octonauts from Chorion.

He was part of a failed £100m bid backed by private equity firm 3i to buy Virgin Radio from SMG plc in 2005. In March 2007, he was appointed as SMG's non-executive director.

Alli was a founder investor in Koovs, an Indian online retailer looking to replicate the success of ASOS in the subcontinent. The company was set up in 2012, intending to raise £22m with a stock market listing on London's AIM. In December 2019, the company went into administration after funding could not be found. The administration of Koovs was extended due to shareholders' concerns. FRP Advisory state this in their most recent update to the market.

== Politics ==
Alli joined the Labour Party at the persuasion of his neighbour Emily Thornberry, to whom he remains close. He is also close to Anji Hunter, director of government relations in Tony Blair's first government. Prime Minister Blair used him for years as a means to help him reach out to a younger generation (aka "youth subculture"). He was made a life peer as Baron Alli, of Norbury in the London Borough of Croydon, on 18 July 1998 at the age of 33, becoming the youngest and the first openly gay peer in Parliament. He sits on the Labour benches in the House of Lords. The BBC summarised his appointment as "the antithesis of the stereotypical 'establishment' peer – young, Asian and from the world of media and entertainment".

He maintains ties with his Caribbean roots, both with other British-Guyanese politicians such as Valerie Amos and Trevor Phillips, and with President Bharrat Jagdeo.

Alli has used his political position to argue for gay rights. He spearheaded the campaign to repeal Section 28. He advocated lowering the age of consent for homosexuals from 18 to 16, equal to heterosexuals; this eventually became law as the Sexual Offences (Amendment) Act 2000. It was during a heated exchange with conservative opponents, led by Baroness Young, that he informed his fellow peers that he was gay. In April 1999, he said in a speech, "I have never been confused about my sexuality. I have been confused about the way I am treated as a result of it. The only confusion lies in the prejudice shown, some of it tonight [i.e. in the House], and much of it enshrined in the law."

In 2006, he participated in the International Conference on LGBT Human Rights adopting the Declaration of Montreal and in 2009, he spearheaded an effort to repeal clauses in the Civil Partnership Act 2004 which prohibited religious institutions from conducting the ceremonies on their premises. This campaign culminated in a bipartisan amendment, which became part of the Equality Act 2010. He influenced the draft Communications Bill in 2003.

In 2020, Alli donated £100,000 to Sir Keir Starmer's Labour Party leadership campaign, and under Starmer's leadership he has led the Labour Party's fundraising efforts. In 2024, The Guardian reported that Alli had donated £500,000 to the party since 2020, as well as giving Starmer personal donations worth over £50,000.

== Controversies ==
In August 2024, The Times reported that Alli had been given unrestricted access to 10 Downing Street, uncommon for anyone not formally employed in the Prime Minister's office, and that he had held a reception for party donors in the Downing Street garden. Pat McFadden later told Sky News that he did not think that Alli still held a Downing Street pass. He was also reported to have gifted Starmer nearly £16,200 of free clothing, which initially was not properly declared, while Starmer's wife, Victoria, was given £5,000 of free clothing, which at first was not declared. The Daily Telegraph referred to Alli's loan of a "swanky" apartment to the Starmers, with a value of £20,000, as "donor-gate." Labour MPs repeatedly used the apartment. On 13 December 2021, during the COVID-19 pandemic in the United Kingdom, Starmer recorded there a Christmas message urging the public to work from home, while giving the impression he was in his own home, with a family photo behind him.

The Telegraph also reported that Deputy Prime Minister Angela Rayner faced an investigation by the parliamentary standards commissioner over the use of Alli's $2.5-million New York apartment. On 27 September, Starmer admitted Alli gave him £32,000 to pay for clothing, double what he had previously declared.

As of October 2024, Lord Alli is under investigation by the House of Lords Commissioner for Standards for "alleged non-registration of interests leading to potential breaches of paragraphs 14(a) and 17 of the thirteenth edition of the Code of Conduct for Members of the House of Lords".

== Philanthropy and recognition ==
=== Philanthropy ===
Alli's work has focused on gay rights, youth and education.

He is the president of the Croydon Youth Development Trust. He is a patron of Skillset, the Sector Skills Council supporting skills and training within the creative media industries.

In 2002 he became a patron of The Albert Kennedy Trust, stating: "Being a teenager isn't easy and it's particularly difficult for vulnerable and socially excluded members of our community. The Albert Kennedy Trust offers young gay men, trans people, lesbians and bisexuals a unique and targeted service. My first task as Patron will be to support plans to extend these services across the UK, to help the increasing number of young people contacting the Trust." Alli is a patron of Oxford Pride, the annual Pride event in Oxfordshire, of Pride London and of the Elton John AIDS Foundation.

=== Recognition ===
Alli has been regarded as one of a number of prominent Guyanese people in Britain. A portrait of him is in the National Portrait Gallery collection.

Academic offices
| Preceded by The Baroness Prashar | Chancellor of De Montfort University; 2006–2015 | Succeeded by The Baroness Lawrence of Clarendon |
Orders of precedence in the United Kingdom
| Preceded by The Lord Clement-Jones | Gentlemen; Baron Alli | Followed by The Lord Burns |
