= Genci Xhelaj =

Albanian human rights activist

- Xhelaj in 2026
- Born: Tirana, People's Socialist Republic of Albania
- Citizenship: Albania
- Occupations: Human rights activist Hotel manager
- Years active: 1994–1997
- Organization: Shoqata Gay Albania
- Known for: Campaigning for the legalisation of same-sex relations in Albania
- Awards: Felipa de Souza Award (1997)

Genci Xhelaj is an Albanian human rights activist. In 1994, he founded Shoqata Gay Albania, the first LGBTQ rights organisation to operate in Albania following the fall of communism in 1991. In recognition of his work, Xhelaj was awarded the Felipa de Souza Award from the International Gay and Lesbian Human Rights Commission in 1997.

== Early life ==
Xhelaj was born in Tirana in what was then the People's Socialist Republic of Albania. Xhelaj knew he was gay from a young age, and attempted suicide several times during adolescence because of his sexuality. He reported becoming more accepting of his identity during his twenties while working as a hotel manager in Tirana, where he met openly LGBTQ people for the first time.

== Activism ==
In March 1994, Xhelaj wrote an open letter for the Albanian magazine Playboy in which he discussed his experiences as a gay man living in Albania. The letter received positive and negative responses; the German politician and activist Volker Beck met Xhelaj and encouraged him to form an organisation to protect and promote LGBTQ rights in the country.

On 29 March 1994, Xhelaj founded Shoqata Gay Albania (SGA; lit. 'Gay Albania Association'). The SGA had three core principles: to support the interests of "Albanian homosexuals (male and female)"; to spread "positive and more objective information" about the LGBTQ community living in Albania; and to support the "fight against AIDS". The SGA had ten members at the time of its establishment, with Xhelaj serving as its first president. Xhelaj was unable to legally register the organisation due to homosexuality being illegal under Albanian law.

The SGA initially struggled to gain traction due to financial difficulties; it appealed for support from international organisations such as the International Gay and Lesbian Human Rights Commission (IGLHRC), which subsequently urged Kedret Çela, the Minister of Justice, to let Xhelaj legally register the SGA as a non-government organisation. The SGA began to distribute leaflets sharing information about LGBTQ people in the streets of Tirana. The SGA's actions caught the attention of local media outlets, including the newspaper Gazeta Shqiptare, which described the groups actions as a "courageous step" due to the illegality of homosexual relations at that time. As the SGA gained greater attention in 1994, members of the group were physically attacked by police officers, reportedly in an attempt to identify its leadership. Xhelaj subsequently publicly identified himself as being the organisation's founder and president and attended the International AIDS Conference in Budapest, Hungary.

In 1994, the Albanian government announced plans to amend the penal code to reduce the prison sentence for homosexuality from ten years to three. Xhelaj began to campaign for homosexuality to be decriminalised altogether. Pederasty had been made illegal by the communist government in 1977, which at the time had also been the term used to refer to homosexuality; Xhelaj and the SGA also called on the government to stop using pederastia, the Albanian term for pedarasty, to refer to consensual adult homosexual relationships. The campaign was supported from the Council of Europe and the IGLHRC; the American activist Scott Long also joined the campaign during a trip to Tirana. On 20 January 1995, the government legalised same-sex relationships, and later that year, the Albanian Gay and Lesbian Association (ALGA) became the first legally-recognised LGBTQ rights group in Albania, succeeding the work of the SGA.

== Personal life ==
In 1997, Xhelaj received the Felipa de Souza Award from the IGLHRC, in recognition of his role in the advancement of LGBTQ rights in Albania, including the legalisation of same-sex relationships in 1995, alongside Demet Demir, Sister Namibia, and Wilfredo Valencia Palacios. While in New York City to receive the award, Xhelaj applied for political asylum in the United States. After receiving asylum, he went on to work as the manager of a Starbucks in St. Petersburg, Florida.
