= Tom Kuka =

Albanian television presenter, writer and journalist (born 1972)

Enkel Demi
- Born: 1 August 1972 (age 54); Tirana, PR Albania
- Occupations: Writer, journalist
- Spouse: Mesila Doda
- Writing career
- Pen name: Tom Kuka
- Language: Albanian
- Notable works: Hide mbi kalldrëm (2016); Gurët e vetmisë (2018); Ora e ligë (2019); Flama (2021)
- Notable awards: European Union Prize for Literature (2021)

Enkel Demi (pen name Tom Kuka; born 1 August 1972) is an Albanian writer, journalist, television presenter and former news anchor. He made his literary debut in 2016 with the historical novel Hide mbi kalldrëm (Jujube on Cobblestone). In November 2018, he published his second novel, Gurët e vetmisë (Stones of Loneliness), a family saga which won the national prize for literature in 2019. His next novel was Ora e ligë (Evil Hour, 2019), followed by fourth novel Flama (Calamity), which was published in March 2021. Kuka won the EU Prize for literature for Flama.
