= Mesila Doda =

Member of Albanian Parliament

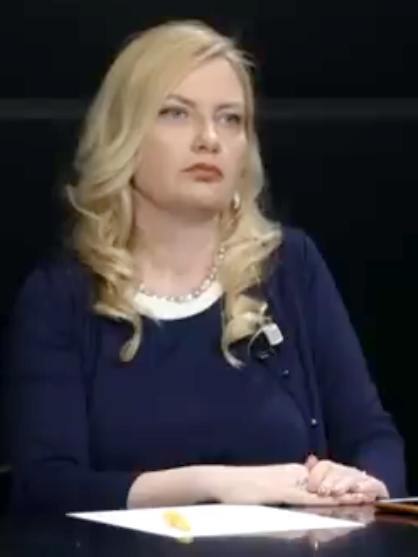
- In a 2019 interview

Member of the Albanian parliament
- In office September 2001 – September 2017

Personal details
- Born: 6 February 1971 (age 55) Kukës, Albania
- Party: Democratic Party (1991-2016); PDIU (2016- )
- Spouse: Enkel Demi
- Education: University of Tirana; Pontifical Urban University
- Profession: Journalist, politician

Mesila Doda (born 6 February 1971) was one of the first members of the Democratic Party of Albania and a member of the Albanian parliament from 2001 until 2017.

== Early life ==
She studied economics at the University of Tirana and philosophy in Rome.

== Career ==
Doda started her political career in 1991, during student protests that caused the change of regime in Albania. She has held different political positions. She has also worked as a journalist and TV presenter. She joined the Democratic party in 1991, and left in 2016.

After leaving the Democratic Party of Albania she joined the Party for Justice, Integration and Unity, which is focused on advocating national issues like the Cham issue.

She is one of the most conservative MP's on the Parliament and has recently opposed legislation that grants equal rights to LGBT people and legalization of marijuana and prostitution. She was accused of discrimination against the LGBT community. In October 2024, Doda became involved in a high-profile public dispute with Albanian LGBT rights activists Xheni Karaj and Kisti Pinderi. Following Doda's public commentary on family values and social policy, Pinderi issued a sharp rebuke. The exchange sparked widespread media coverage in Albania and renewed public discussion over the tone of political discourse and LGBTQ rights.
