= Elton John AIDS Foundation =

Organization

- Founded: 1992; 34 years ago United States; 1993; United Kingdom,
- Founder: Elton John
- Purpose: HIV/AIDS
- Locations: New York City, New York, U.S.; London, England, U.K.
- Website: eltonjohnaidsfoundation.org

The Elton John AIDS Foundation (EJAF) is a nonprofit organization established by the British musician Elton John in 1992 in the United States and 1993 in the United Kingdom to support innovative HIV prevention, education programs, direct care and support services to people living with or at risk of HIV. It has raised over $565 million to support HIV-related programs across ninety countries.

The Elton John AIDS Foundation is in the top 10 philanthropic funders of HIV/AIDS grants worldwide, the second largest HIV-related philanthropic funder of LGBTQ+ communities, and number one philanthropic funder in Eastern Europe and Central Asia. The organization supports its work through proceeds from special events, cause-related marketing projects, and voluntary contributions from individuals, corporations and foundations. The organization has been well-known in Hollywood since 1993, when it began hosting the annual Elton John AIDS Foundation Academy Award Party.

EJAF is chaired by David Furnish, a producer of theater and music. He has been in a relationship with Elton John since 1993; they entered a civil partnership in 2005 and married in 2014.

== Origin ==
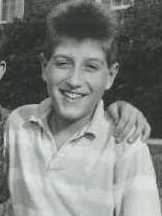
Ryan White in 1989

John was inspired to start the organization after losing two friends to AIDS in the span of a year. One was Ryan White, a young man who was infected with HIV by a blood transfusion and who died in 1990. White's personable and compassionate persona helped to reduce stigmatizing attitudes towards people living with HIV, an effort that EJAF continues. John also lost his friend Freddie Mercury, a fellow musician best known as the lead singer of the rock band Queen, who died of AIDS-related bronchial pneumonia in 1991. John paid tribute to both of them in concert––he performed at The Freddie Mercury Tribute Concert for AIDS Awareness in 1992 and dedicated his song "Skyline Pigeon" to White at his funeral.

== Programs funded by EJAF ==
The Elton John AIDS Foundation funds programs across all aspects of the disease, including prevention, testing, treatment, palliative care, education and global health initiatives. Part of EJAF's strategy to effectively support people affected by HIV is to fund a broader scope of projects; their grants are not exclusively held by initiatives that are specifically HIV-focused. They also fund programs dedicated to supporting specific HIV risk groups or under-attended regions with high prevalences of HIV. This strategy has been praised and shared as a model for non-profits dedicated to similar epidemics.

Initiatives funded by EJAF include:

- A ten-year partnership program for AIDS research between the governments of Swaziland and the UK. The program focused on research and treatment strategies in Swaziland.
- A pilot program for the care of pregnant women in the Bobete village of Lesotho, a small African country with an HIV prevalence of 23.8%.
- The International Observatory on End of Life Care at Lancaster University, which reviews and draws attention to hospice and palliative care across the globe (especially in poor regions).

== Events ==
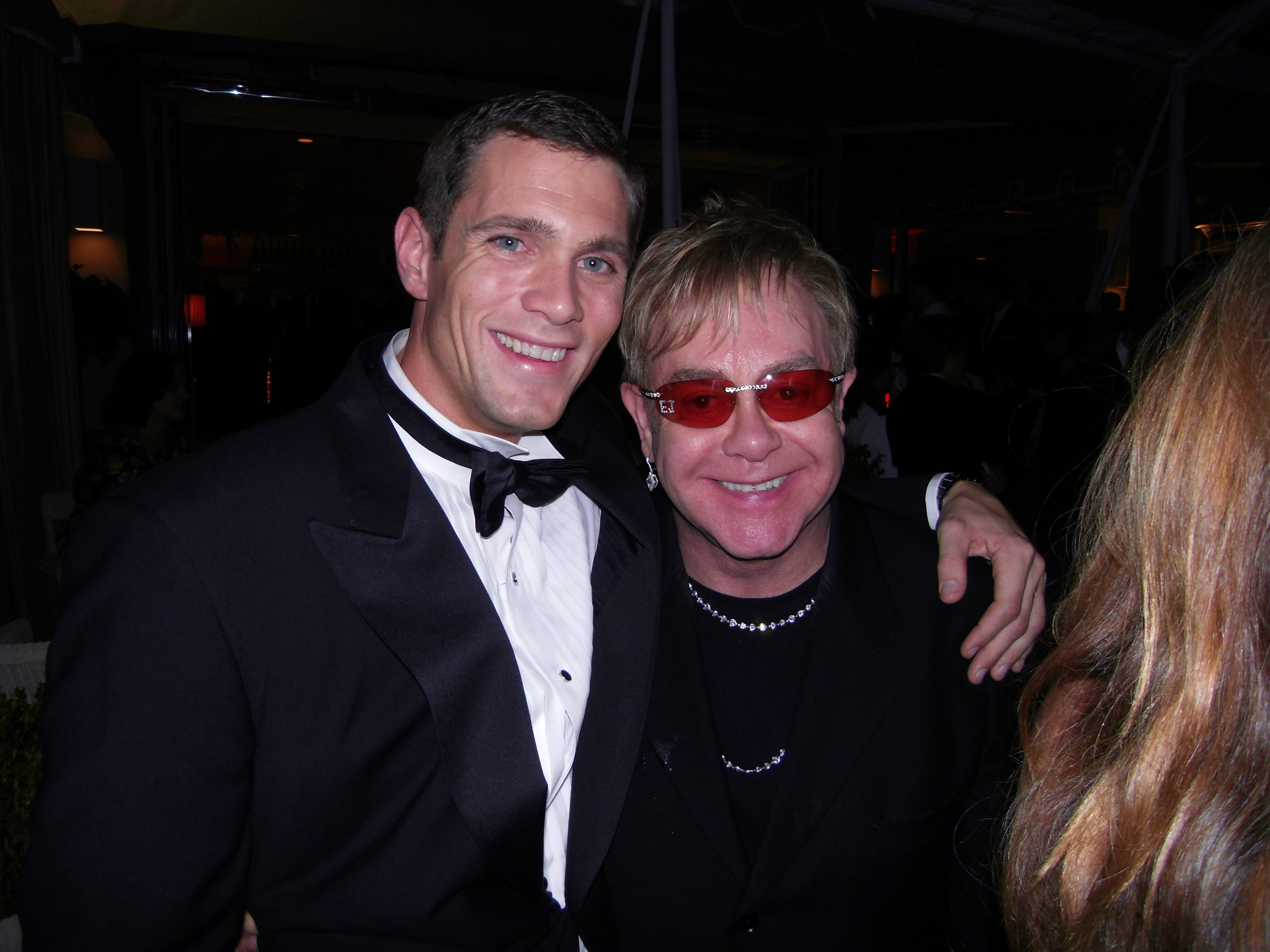
Elton John and Christopher McDaniel at EJAF's 2009 Academy Awards Party

=== Elton John AIDS Foundation Academy Award Party ===
Every year, the foundation throws a viewing party for the Academy Awards. It is an invitation-only event that has grown to become one of the most desired invitations in the entertainment industry, as well as one of EJAF's most fruitful fundraising efforts. The tradition has been going since the foundation was created in 1992. For the first few years, the party was a dinner held at the Maple Drive restaurant in Beverly Hills. The inaugural dinner was arranged by Patrick Lippet, another activist in Hollywood who was best known for his work with the Rock the Vote campaign. Lippet died from AIDS only three months after helping Elton John put together the first EJAF Oscar night party.

In 1998, the party moved to Spago, another upscale restaurant in Beverly Hills known for its celebrity clientele. It has moved multiple times since then with the West Hollywood Park in Los Angeles serving as the venue in 2018 and 2019.

The event features dinner, a live broadcast of the Academy Awards Ceremony, and a post-broadcast after-party with live music. John tends to pick upcoming bands. The 2018 party featured the band Greta Van Fleet as the headliner.

Fundraising occurs before, during and after the event. Guests pay an entry fee in order to get in. Once inside, they are encouraged to pledge donations to EJAF in between the Oscars broadcast. Towards the end of the event, an auction is held, the proceeds of which also benefit EJAF. In 2018, the auction alone raised $725,000. The entire event raised 5.9 million dollars.

=== An Enduring Vision Annual Gala ===
EJAF's other major fundraiser is an annual gala in New York that was started in 2001. The event is meant to honor longstanding partners, donors or supporters of EJAF with the foundation's Enduring Visions Award. The event is usually hosted by another celebrity and includes a reception, a dinner with the awards presentation, and a musical guest. The fundraising is achieved through the ticket fees and a live action similar to the one that takes place at the Academy Awards party.

Recent award recipients include Patricia Hearst, Steve Tisch, former Secretary of State Hillary Clinton, and United Nations Secretary-General Ban Ki-moon. The gala has been hosted by various celebrities, such as Gayle King and Anderson Cooper. Unlike the Academy Award Party, which usually features an upcoming or lesser known artist, the musical guests for the EJAF An Enduring Vision Gala are usually well-known artists from a variety of genres; previous performers for the event include Stevie Nicks and Sheryl Crow.

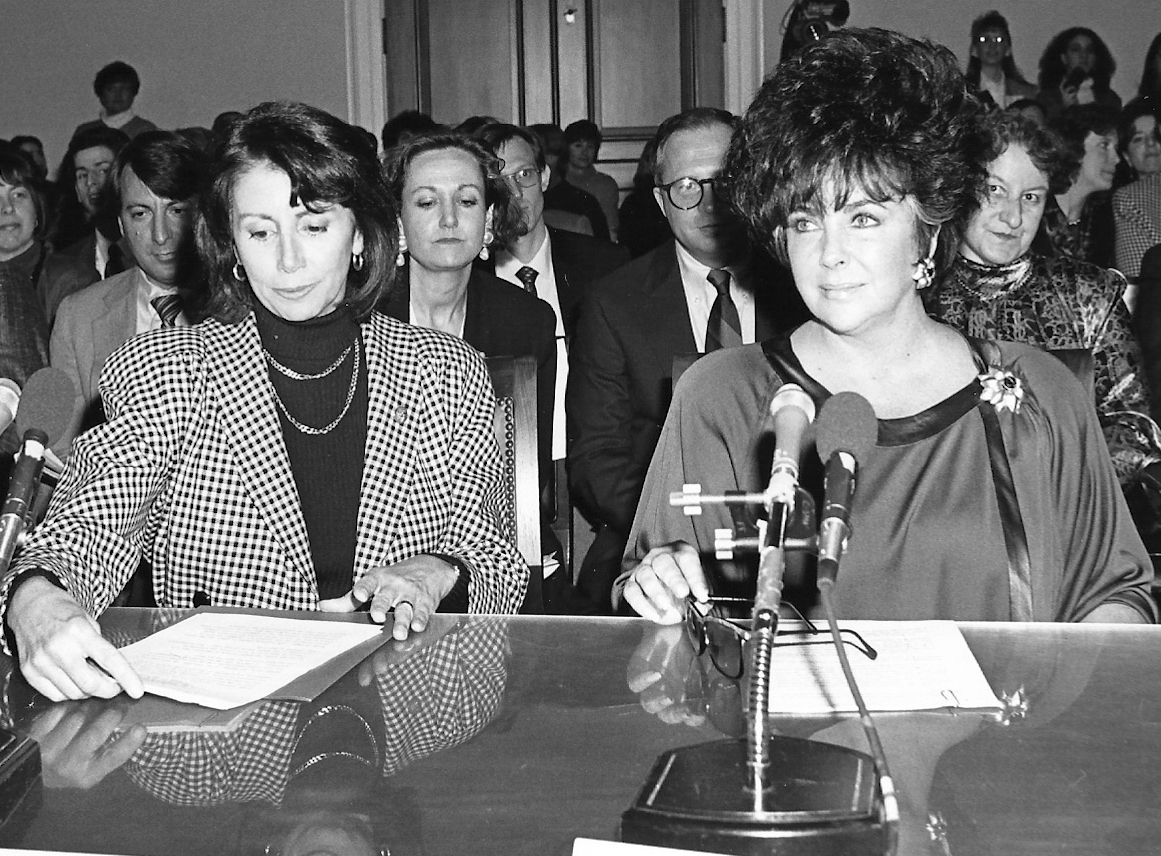
Elizabeth Taylor and Nancy Pelosi Testifying Before the House Budget Committee on HIV-AIDS Funding

== Partnership with Elizabeth Taylor AIDS Foundation ==
Until her death in 2011, actress and activist Elizabeth Taylor and Elton John were close friends. Taylor was a public AIDS activist since the 1980s and founded the Elizabeth Taylor AIDS Foundation (ETAF) in 1991. Like EJAF, Taylor's foundation focused on fundraising for AIDS programs (especially focused on marginalized regions). She also engaged in plenty of individual advocacy; she testified before Congress multiple times to support AIDS-related legislation, including the Ryan White bill for AIDS funding in 1986. The two celebrities supported each other's organizations often; Taylor spoke at various EJAF events, and John performed at many ETAF fundraisers, starting from the very first ETAF benefit concert in Madison Square Garden on October 11, 1992. The two foundations have also partnered throughout their history to provide bilaterally funded grants to projects that fall within both of their missions.

In 2016, EJAF partnered with the Elizabeth Taylor AIDS Foundation (ETAF) in an initiative to combat AIDS in the Southern United States. They offered grants of $330,000 (funded by both foundations) to five different initiatives in the American South, a region that contains about 44% of the country's HIV-positive population. The five initiatives funded by the combined effort were:

- Memphis Gay and Lesbian Community Center (MGLCC)
- Georgia Equality/Equality Foundation of Georgia
- JASMYN (non-profit for LGBTQ youth in Jacksonville)
- Racial Justice Action Center (Atlanta)
- Birmingham AIDS Outreach (BAO)

== Finances ==
With the exception of a three-year period during which the IRS had to press EJAF to get their tax forms (1996–1999), the foundation has been deemed generally transparent and financially trustworthy.

== Patrons ==
Patrons include:

- Waheed Alli, Baron Alli
- Boris Becker
- David Beckham
- Victoria Beckham
- Arpad Busson
- David Frost
- Elizabeth Hurley
- Annie Lennox
- Tamara Mellon
- George Michael
- Simon Rattle
- Grey Ruthven, 2nd Earl of Gowrie
- Sting
- Trudie Styler
- Neil Tennant
- Emma Thompson
- Charlie Sheen
- Donatella Versace

== Ban in Russia ==
In April 2025, Russia's prosecutor general's office designated the EJAF as an "undesirable organisation", a label that bans the group from operating in Russia and exposes its staff and partners to potential criminal prosecution. The reason for this were the accusations of promoting "non-traditional sexual relationships, western family models, and gender reassignment". The prosecutor's office alleged that EJAF held "negative attitudes" toward countries that "uphold traditional spiritual and moral values". It also accused the foundation of taking part in a campaign to "discredit Russia" since its 2022 invasion of Ukraine.
