= Akt (charity) =

UK LGBTQ+ youth homelessness charity

akt
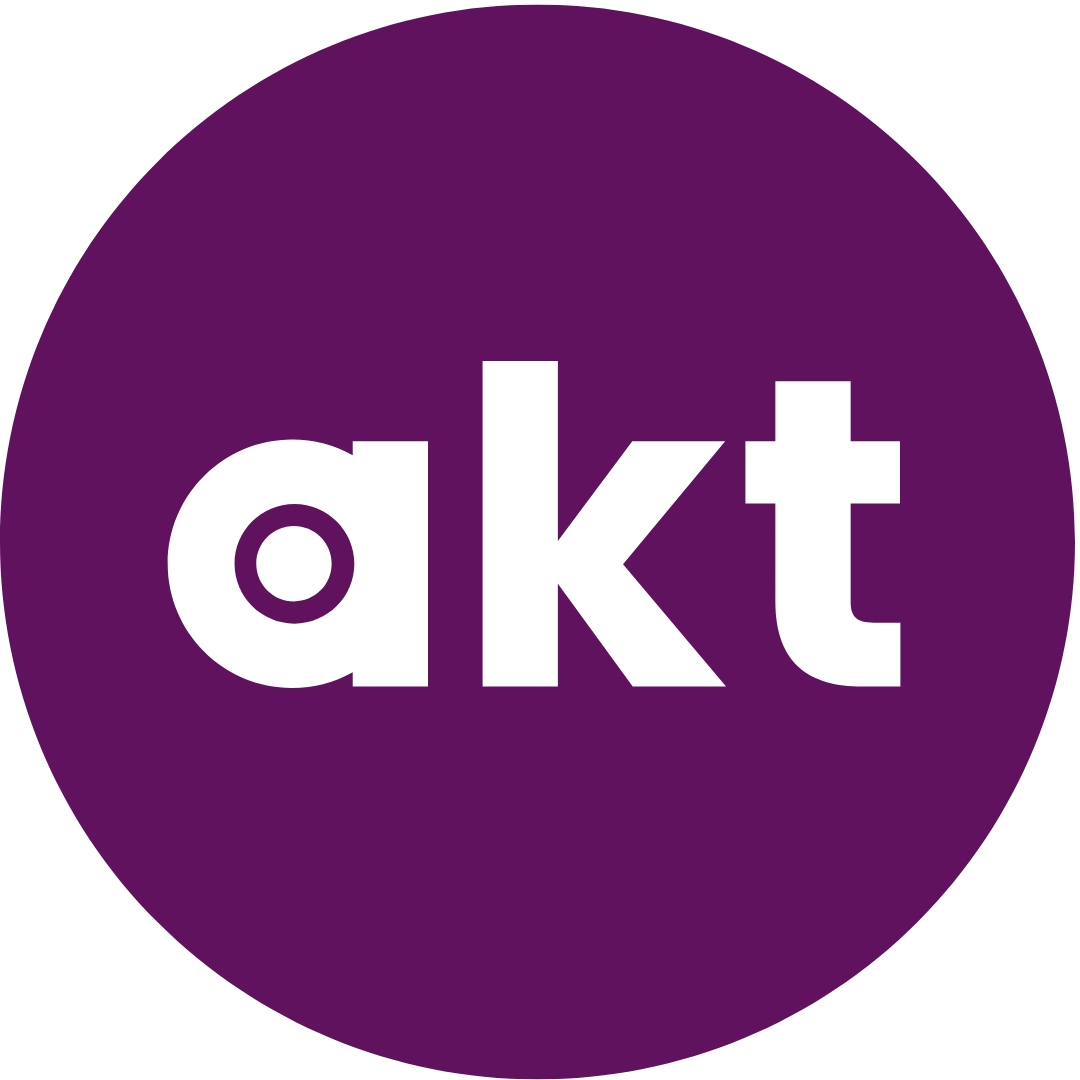
- Albert Kennedy Trust logo
- Founded: 1989
- Founder: Cath Hall
- Registration no.: 1093815
- Purpose: Homeless LGBTQ+ youth
- Location: England
- Key people: Cath Hall (Founder) Adam Pemberton Wickham (Chief Executive Officer)
- Website: www.akt.org.uk
- Formerly called: Albert Kennedy Trust

AKT (stylised as akt and legally known as The Albert Kennedy Trust) is a voluntary organisation based in England, created in 1989 to serve lesbian, gay, bisexual and transgender (LGBTQ+) young people who are homeless or living in a hostile environment. It started in Greater Manchester in 1989 and opened in London in 1996, and expanded to Newcastle in 2013, Newcastle upon Tyne and Bristol.

== History ==
The charity is named after Albert Kennedy (31 January 1973 – 30 April 1989), a 16-year-old Social Services care leaver from Manchester who was gay. Kennedy died after falling from the top of Chorlton Street multi-storey car park. Despite an inquest, the circumstances of his death remain unclear. The official version is that he died from misadventure.

Kennedy had experienced a great deal of homophobia during his life. Manchester's gay community was moved into action by the Trust's founder patron Cath Hall. Cath Hall was a straight foster carer who saw the need for an organisation to be set up to support young lesbian, gay, bi and trans people who were facing homelessness because of rejection at home. She had observed that Kennedy's case was not isolated, and that many other LGBTQ+ young people in and out of the foster care system were struggling with the effects of homophobia. Hall described the founding of the trust as "an emotional response, an angry response, to what was going on".

As a result, the Albert Kennedy Trust was formed, officially becoming a Trust in 1990.

In 2019 the Albert Kennedy Trust rebranded as akt.

== Support and services ==
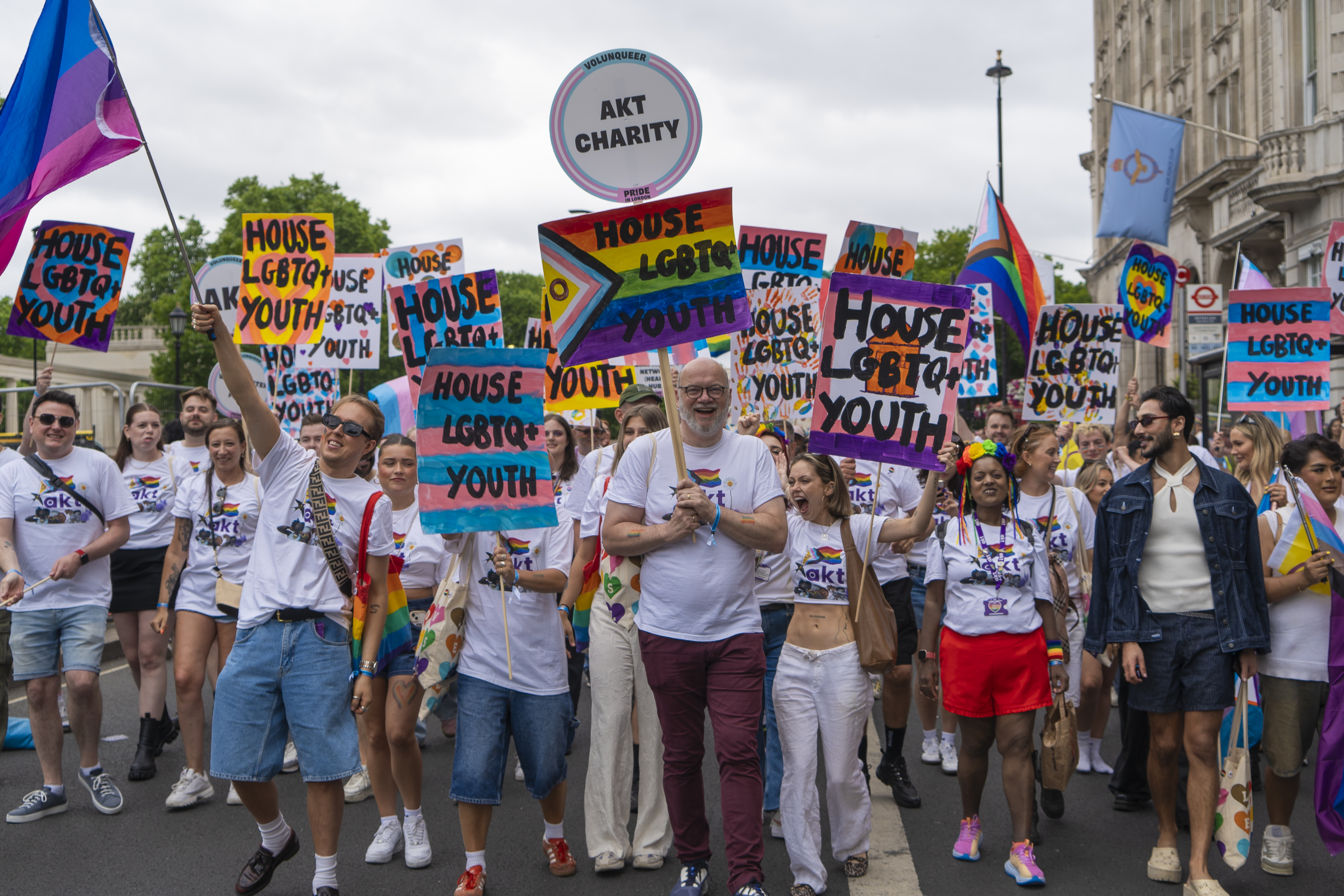
CEO Adam Pemberton Wickham (Centre) Marches with akt staff, volunteers and partners at London Pride 2025

Akt supports LGBTQ+ young people aged 16–25 in the UK who are facing or experiencing homelessness or living in a hostile environment.

== Key dates ==
The Trust also provided services in Brighton starting in 2003, but due to funding issues had to withdraw from the city in May 2006.

It has traditionally gained funding through individual donations and grants from such bodies as Association of London Government, Comic Relief, the Princess Diana Memorial Fund, and Manchester City Council.

The Trust marked its 16th anniversary of formally becoming a Trust in June 2006 with a House of Lords reception by Patron Lord Alli. The occasion was also marked by an Early Day Motion in the House of Commons.

On 5 January 2007, Sir Ian McKellen became a patron of the trust, joining existing patrons Julie Hesmondhalgh and Lord Alli.

In 2013, the Trust merged with Outpost, a pre-existing homeless charity for LGBTQ+ youth in Newcastle, extending the reach of the Trust to the North-East of England.

In 2014, the Albert Kennedy Trust marked its 25th anniversary with a number of events in honour of Albert Kennedy and the continued work of the Trust.

In 2019, the Albert Kennedy Trust marked its 30th anniversary with a rebrand to akt.

In June 2019, Prince William said he would be "absolutely fine" if his children came out as gay or lesbian at an event at the London office of the Trust.

An online poll of 2109 people by YouGov on behalf of akt asked people how they would feel in a range of scenarios if they had a child who came out to them as lesbian, gay, bisexual or transgender. When respondents were asked whether they would "feel proud to have an LGBT child", 26 per cent of those polled disagreed. Less than half (46 per cent) of people surveyed agreed with the statement that they would feel proud to have a child who had come out. The poll, undertaken in October 2019, found more than one in 10 (11 per cent) would feel uncomfortable living at home with their lesbian, gay, bisexual or transgender child.

In 2022, akt opened in Bristol.
