= Ermir Dobjani =

Albanian lawyer

1st Ombudsman of Albania
- In office 16 February 2000 – 16 February 2010
- Succeeded by: Igli Totozani

Personal details
- Born: April 6, 1953 (age 73) Kavajë, Albania
- Spouse: Aida Dobjani
- Children: 2 (Sarah, Erajd)

Ermir Dobjani (born 6 April 1953, in Kavajë) is an Albanian lawyer who served as Albania's first Ombudsman (Avokati i Popullit), a post he held from 2000 to 2010.

== Career ==
Dobjani graduated with Honors in Law from the Faculty of Political Science and Law at the University of Tirana in 1976. From 1981 to 1988 he was an external lecturer of administrative law in this faculty, and from 1989 to 1991 he worked as an internal lecturer and directed the Public Law Department. In 1994, Dobjani founded the Dobjani Lawyers law office, which operated for six years until 2000, when the office was temporarily closed due to the public office which Dobjani was elected to. From February 2000 to February 2010, Dobjani was elected from the Albanian Parliament for two mandates in the public office of the Albanian Ombudsman (People’s Advocate). He was awarded the science degree of Doctor of Law in 1991 and the Professor title in 2010. Dobjani is the head professor of administrative law in the Faculty of Law at Tirana University and serves as Senior Partner of the Dobjani Lawyers law office. Dobjani has more than thirty years of experience in practicing law, his main areas of expertise being human rights, administrative law, contract law, criminal law and civil and commercial litigation.
