= Chris Ofili =

British painter (born 1968)

Chris Ofili CBE
- Born: Christopher Ofili; 10 October 1968 (age 57); Manchester, England
- Education: Chelsea School of Art; Royal College of Art
- Known for: Painting
- Notable work: The Holy Virgin Mary (1996); No Woman No Cry (1998); The Upper Room (2002)
- Awards: 1998 Turner Prize

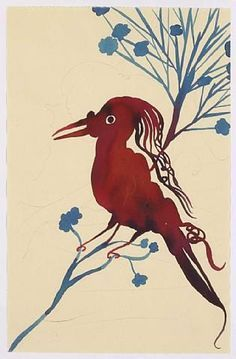
Red Bird – watercolour on paper

Christopher Ofili (born 10 October 1968) is a British painter who won the Turner Prize in 1998. He has used resin, beads, oil paint, glitter, lumps of elephant dung and cut-outs from pornographic magazines as painting elements. Ofili's work has been classified as punk art. He currently lives in Trinidad.

== Early life and education ==
Ofili was born in Manchester, England, to parents May and Michael Ofili of Nigerian descent. When he was eleven, his father left the family and moved back to Nigeria. Ofili was for some years educated at St. Pius X High School for Boys, and then at Xaverian College in Victoria Park, Manchester. Ofili completed a foundation course in art at Tameside College in Ashton-under-Lyne in Greater Manchester and then studied in London, at the Chelsea School of Art from 1988 to 1991 and at the Royal College of Art from 1991 to 1993. In the autumn of 1992, he got a one-year exchange scholarship to Universität der Künste Berlin.

== Career ==
Ofili's early work was heavily influenced by Jean-Michel Basquiat, Georg Baselitz, Philip Guston, and George Condo. Peter Doig was doing graduate work at the Chelsea College of Arts when Ofili was an undergraduate, and they soon became friends. In 2014, art critic Roberta Smith held that Ofili has much in common with painters like Mickalene Thomas, Kerry James Marshall, Robert Colescott and Ellen Gallagher, and with more distant precedents such as Bob Thompson, Beauford Delaney and William H. Johnson.

Ofili was established through exhibitions by Charles Saatchi at his gallery in north London and the travelling exhibition Sensation (1997), becoming recognised as one of the few British artists of African / Caribbean descent to break through as a member of the Young British Artists group. Ofili has also had numerous solo shows since the early 1990s, including at Southampton City Art Gallery. In 1998, Ofili won the Turner Prize, and in 2003 he was selected to represent Britain at the 50th Venice Biennale of that year, where his work for the British Pavilion was done in collaboration with the architect David Adjaye.

In 1992, Ofili won a scholarship that allowed him to travel to Zimbabwe. He studied cave paintings there, which had some effect on his style. His work is often built up in layers of paint, resin, glitter, dung (mainly elephant) and other materials to create a collage.

Between 1995 and 2005, Ofili focused on a series of watercolors, each about 9½ by 6½ inches and produced in a single sitting. They predominantly feature heads of men and women, as well as some studies of flowers and birds. Ofili's paintings also make reference to blaxploitation films and gangsta rap, seeking to question racial and sexual stereotypes in a humorous way. In a series of faces that Ofili called Harems, each arrangement consists of one man with as many as four women on each side of him.

After relocating to Trinidad in 2005, Ofili began a series of blue paintings inspired by the Jab Jab or "blue devils" who participate in the Trinidad and Tobago Carnival, and the Expressionist group of German and Russian artists, Der Blaue Reiter. These paintings often employed the use of a silver, acrylic background with layers of dark oil pigment on top. Later iterations of these works were shown at Ofili's solo show Chris Ofili: Day and Night at The New Museum of New York which were installed in a very dimly lit room, causing viewers to adjust their eyes to the darkness in order to see the paintings.

Ofili was appointed Commander of the Order of the British Empire (CBE) in the 2017 New Year Honours for services to art. Ofili was included in the 2019 edition of the Powerlist, ranking the 100 most influential Black Britons.

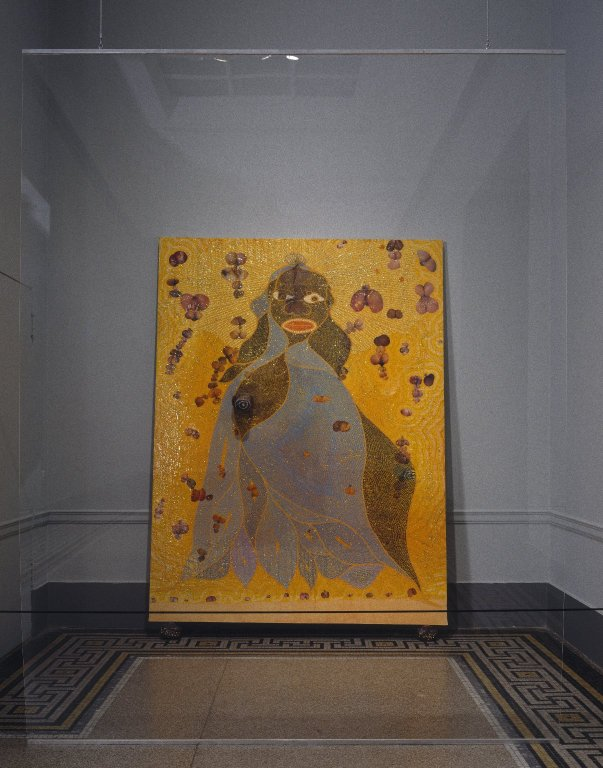
The Holy Virgin Mary, Saatchi Collection (2017)

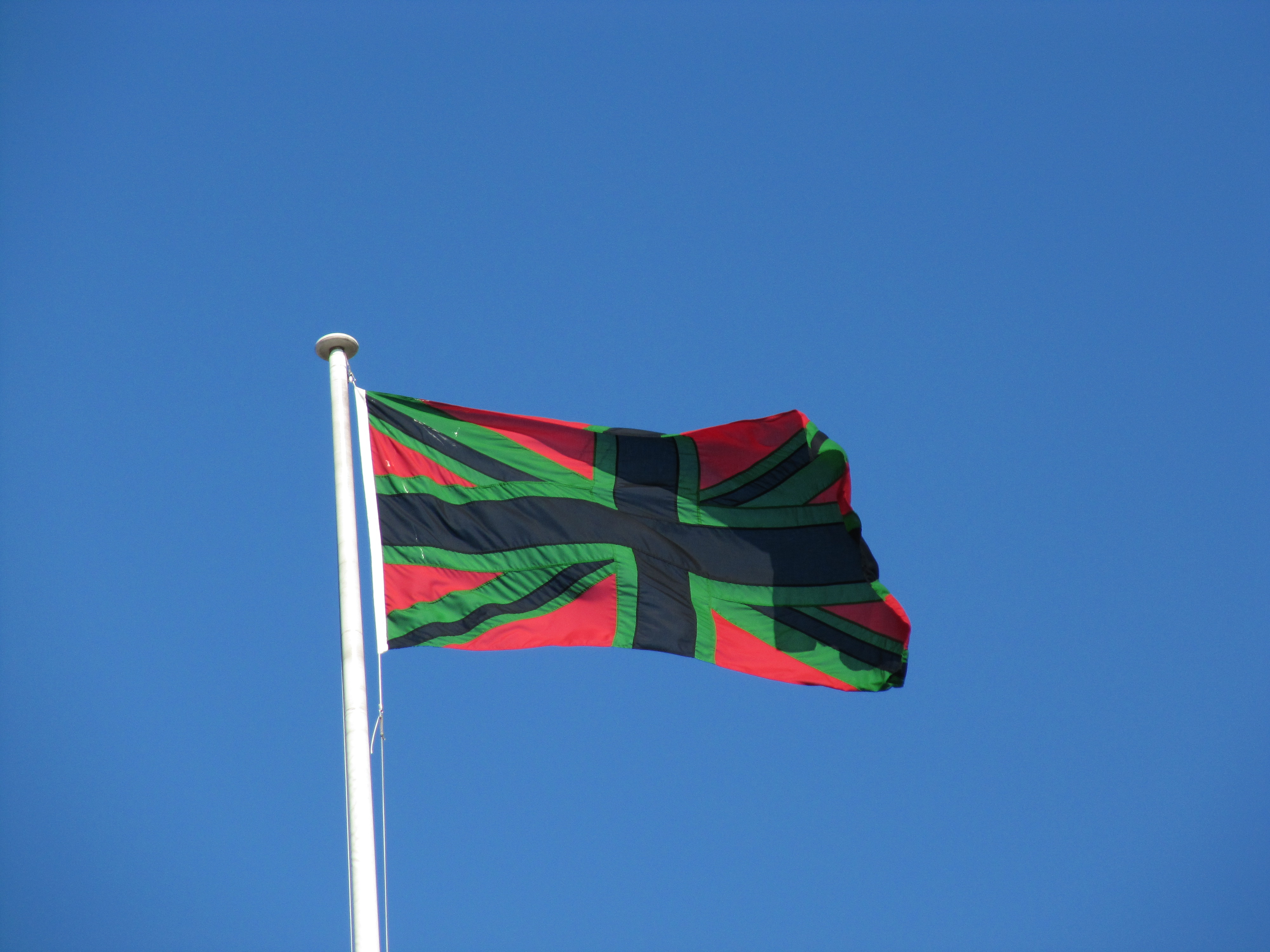
Union Black, Tate Britain (2010)

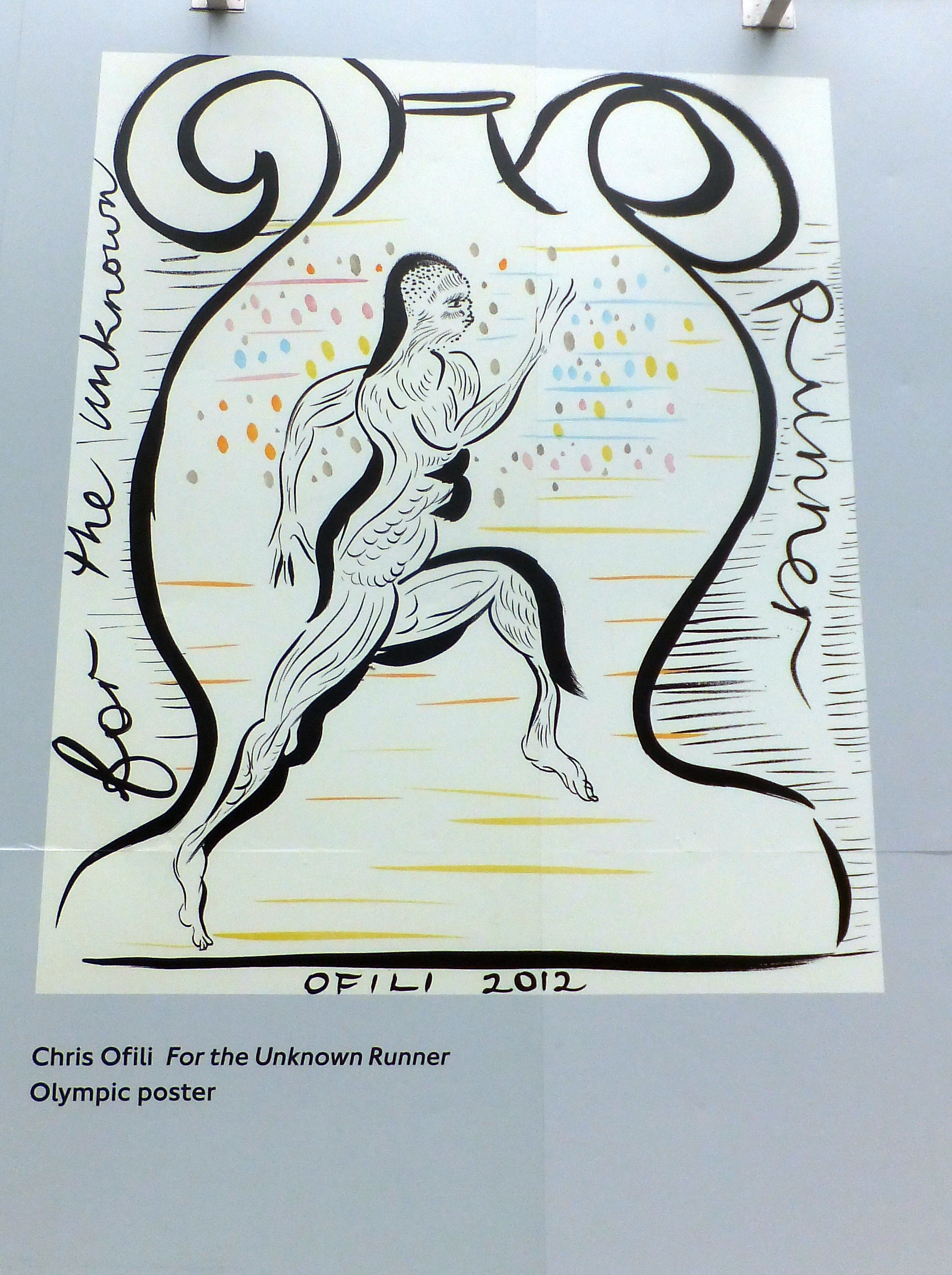
For the Unknown Runner, 2012 Olympics

== Exhibitions ==
Ofili's work was featured in a museum in the 1995 exhibition Brilliant! New Art from London at the Walker Art Center. Significant solo exhibitions include the Arts Club of Chicago (2010), Kestnergesellschaft, Hanover (2006), the Studio Museum in Harlem, New York (2005), and Southampton City Art Gallery (1998). In 2010, Tate Britain presented the most extensive exhibition of his work to date. In 2014, The New Museum in New York presented the first, major solo show of Ofili's work in the U.S. titled Chris Ofili: Night and Day.

== Controversies ==
=== The Holy Virgin Mary ===
One of his paintings, The Holy Virgin Mary, a depiction of the Virgin Mary, was at issue in a lawsuit between the mayor of New York City, Rudy Giuliani, and the Brooklyn Museum of Art when it was exhibited there in 1999 as a part of the Sensation exhibition. The painting depicted a Black Madonna surrounded by images from blaxploitation movies and close-ups of female genitalia cut from pornographic magazines, and elephant dung. These were formed into shapes reminiscent of the cherubim and seraphim commonly depicted in images of the Immaculate Conception and the Assumption of Mary. Following the scandal surrounding this painting, Bernard Goldberg ranked Ofili No. 86 in 100 People Who Are Screwing Up America. Red Grooms showed his support of the artist by purchasing one of Ofili's paintings in 1999, even after Giuliani famously exclaimed, "There’s nothing in the First Amendment that supports horrible and disgusting projects!" The painting was owned by David Walsh and was on display at the Museum of Old and New Art in Hobart, Tasmania. Steven A. Cohen then owned it for three years and donated the painting to the Museum of Modern Art.

=== The Upper Room and the Tate Gallery ===
The Upper Room is an installation of 13 paintings of rhesus macaque monkeys by Ofili in a specially designed room. It was bought by the Tate Gallery in 2005 and caused controversy as Ofili was on the board of the Tate Trustees at the time of the purchase. In 2006 the Charity Commission censured the Tate for this purchase.

== Art market highlights ==
His Orgena, a glittery portrait of a black woman created by the artist for his Turner Prize-winning exhibit at the Tate in 1998 was sold to an American collector for a record £1.8 million, over its £1 million high estimate, at Christie's London in 2010. In 2015, art collector David Walsh sold Ofili's 8-foot-tall The Holy Virgin Mary for £2.9 million at Christie's.

== Works ==
- 2007 Douen’s Dance', painting
- 2007 Christmas Eve (palms)', painting
- 2007 Christmas Eve', graphic art
- 2007 Black Milky Way, graphic art
- 2007 Afrotranslinear', graphic art
- 2007 Lover’s rock — guilt', painting
- 2007 The Raising of Lazarus', painting
- 2006 Belmont Guru', graphic art
- 2006 Untitled', graphic art
- 2006 Untitled', graphic art
- 2006 Thirty Pieces of Silver, painting
- 2006 Her Gift Two & His Gift Two, graphic art
- 2004 Damascus, diptych, graphic art
- 2003 Within Reach, installation at the 50th Venice Biennale
- 2002—2003 Afro Apparition, painting
- 2002 The Kiss, painting
- 2001—2002 Triple Beam Dreamer, painting
- 2001 Monkey Magic — Sex, Drugs & Money — flip side, painting
- 1999—2002 The Upper Room, Victoria Miro Gallery exposition
- 1999 Princess and the Posse, painting
- 1998 No Woman No Cry, painting
- 1998 The Adoration of Captain Shit and the Legend of the Black Stars, painting
- 1996 The Holy Virgin Mary, painting
- 1996 Afrodizzia (2nd version), painting
- 1995—2005 Afro Muses: The Gardener, graphic art
- 1995—2005 Afro Muses: Harem 2, graphic art

Sculpture:

- 2007 The Almighty Shadow, bronze, stainless steel, 106.7 x 114.3 x 27.9 cm
- 2007 Saint Sebastian, bronze
- 2006 Annunciation', bronze, 200.7 x 213.4 x 119.4 cm
- 2006 Mary Magdalene (Infinity), bronze, 109.2 x 73.7 x 68.6 cm
- 2005 Blue Moon, bronze, 205 x 120 x 166 cm
- 2005 Silver Moon, bronze, 201 x 137 x 175 cm

== Personal life ==
Ofili visited Trinidad for the first time in 2000, when he was invited by an international art trust to attend a painting workshop in Port of Spain. He permanently moved to Trinidad in 2005. In 2002, he married Roba El-Essawy, former singer with trip-hop band Attica Blues. They divorced in 2019. He maintains a studio in Port of Spain.

== See also ==
- Indian yellow, historical use of animal waste in art
