= Erinda Ballanca =

Albanian lawyer

3rd Ombudswoman of Albania
- In office 19 June 2017 – 19 December 2025
- Preceded by: Igli Totozani
- Succeeded by: Endri Shabani

Personal details
- Born: October 29, 1973 (age 52) Tirana, PR Albania
- Education: University of Tirana

Erinda Ballanca (born October 29, 1973) is an Albanian lawyer who served as the 3rd Ombudswoman of Albania, from 2017 to 2025.

== Career ==
An experienced lawyer who has been elected in leading positions such as the Steering Council of the Tirana Bar Association and the National Assembly of the Bar Association of Albania, Mrs. Ballanca has contributed to the drafting of Albanian legislation, starting with the Constitution and many other normative acts. She has also given lectures on Constitutional Law.
