= Xheni Karaj =

Albanian LGBTQ rights activist

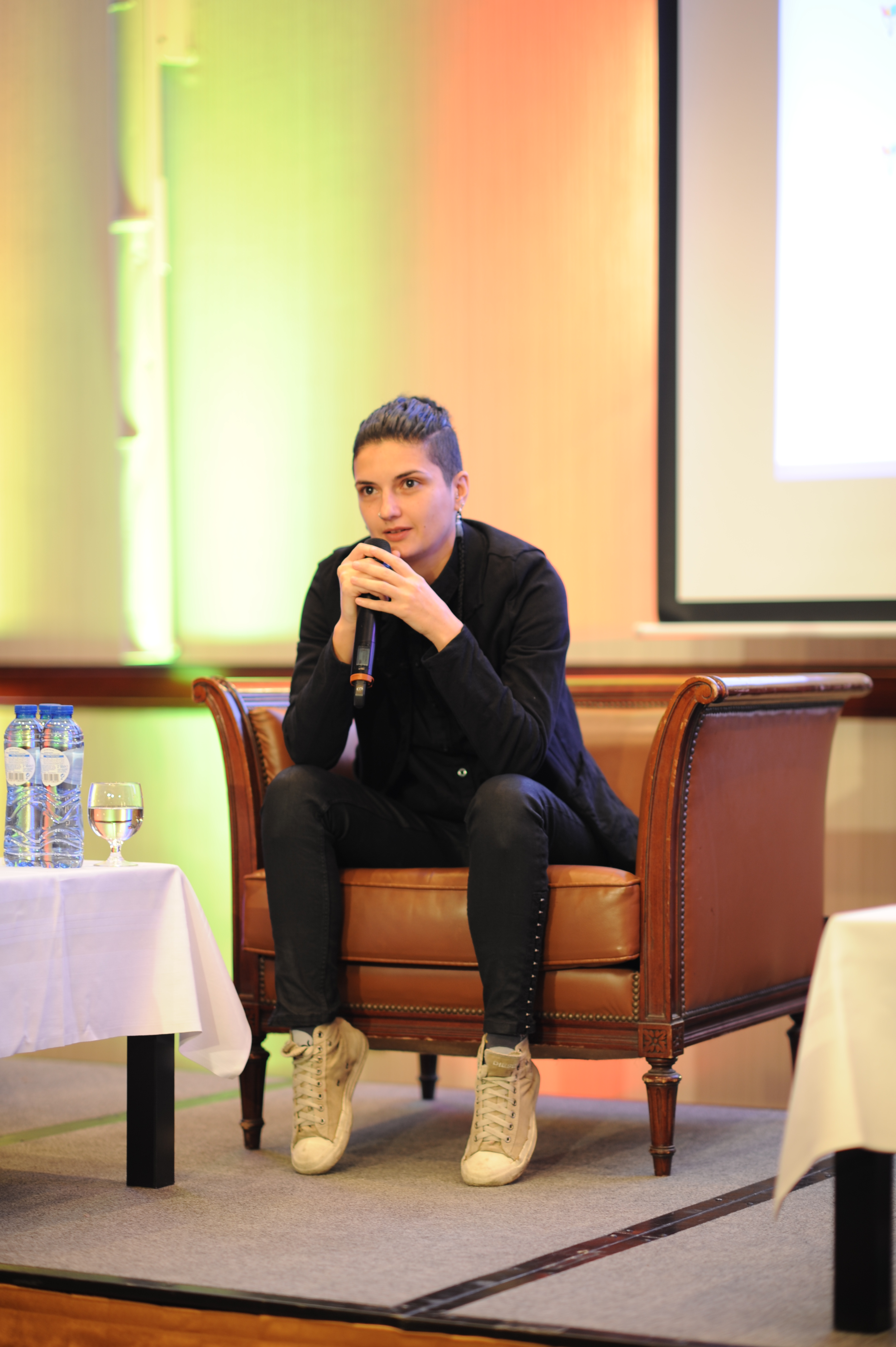
- Xheni Karaj, activist for LGBT community rights in Albania, 2018
- Born: Tirana, Albania
- Education: Bachelor’s degree in Psychology, University of Tirana
- Occupations: LGBT rights activist; executive director of Aleanca LGBT
- Known for: Co‑founder and leader of Aleanca LGBT; organizer of Albania’s first LGBT Pride Parade
- Movement: LGBT rights in Albania; human rights activism
- Awards: Civil Rights Defender of the Year Award (2022)

Xheni Karaj (born in Tirana) is an Albanian LGBT rights activist, and co-founder and current executive of Aleanca LGBT organization.

== Political activism ==
Karaj and LGBTQ-activist Kristi Pinderi were among the first activists to launch the LGBTQ rights movement in Albania. Karaj was the first lesbian woman to be recognized in Tirana by American activist Mindy Michels and her former partner Melissa Schraibman (the latter an employee of the US Embassy in Tirana). Meetings at the home of two Americans helped create a foundation that would serve to establish the LGBT Aleanca organization.

In May 2012, while in the studio of a political show entitled "Opinion" on TV Klan, Karaj made an "unforeseen coming-out" during a fierce debate with Murat Basha, former deputy chairman of the Legality Movement Party. Basha commented on the show with activist Kristi Pinderi, saying, "If my son becomes like you, I better shoot him and go to jail". Karaj described the moment in an interview with Panorama newspaper: "My reaction was unpredictable, it came spontaneously. The language used by Murat Basha was completely unacceptable. It is tragic for families of gay children to hear statements of murder".

Since 2012, Karaj is among the main organizers of the Pride Parade held in May at Dëshmorët e Kombit Bulvar in Tirana. She also co-chaired the "Think Politically" project, where Albanian political parties were pushed to hold a stand on LGBTQ issues for the first time. Together with Pinderi she is the author of SkaNdal, a documentary on the history of the LGBT movement in Albania. Both activists have also built the first STREHA residential shelter for homeless LGBTQ youth.

Karaj is the second LGBTQ activist from Albania to be involved with the Civil Rights Defenders project, the Natalia Project. This project was conceived as a security system where all human rights defenders have a bracelet that they wear and can activate. After activation, a signal is transmitted to the members of this project to assist the affected activist.

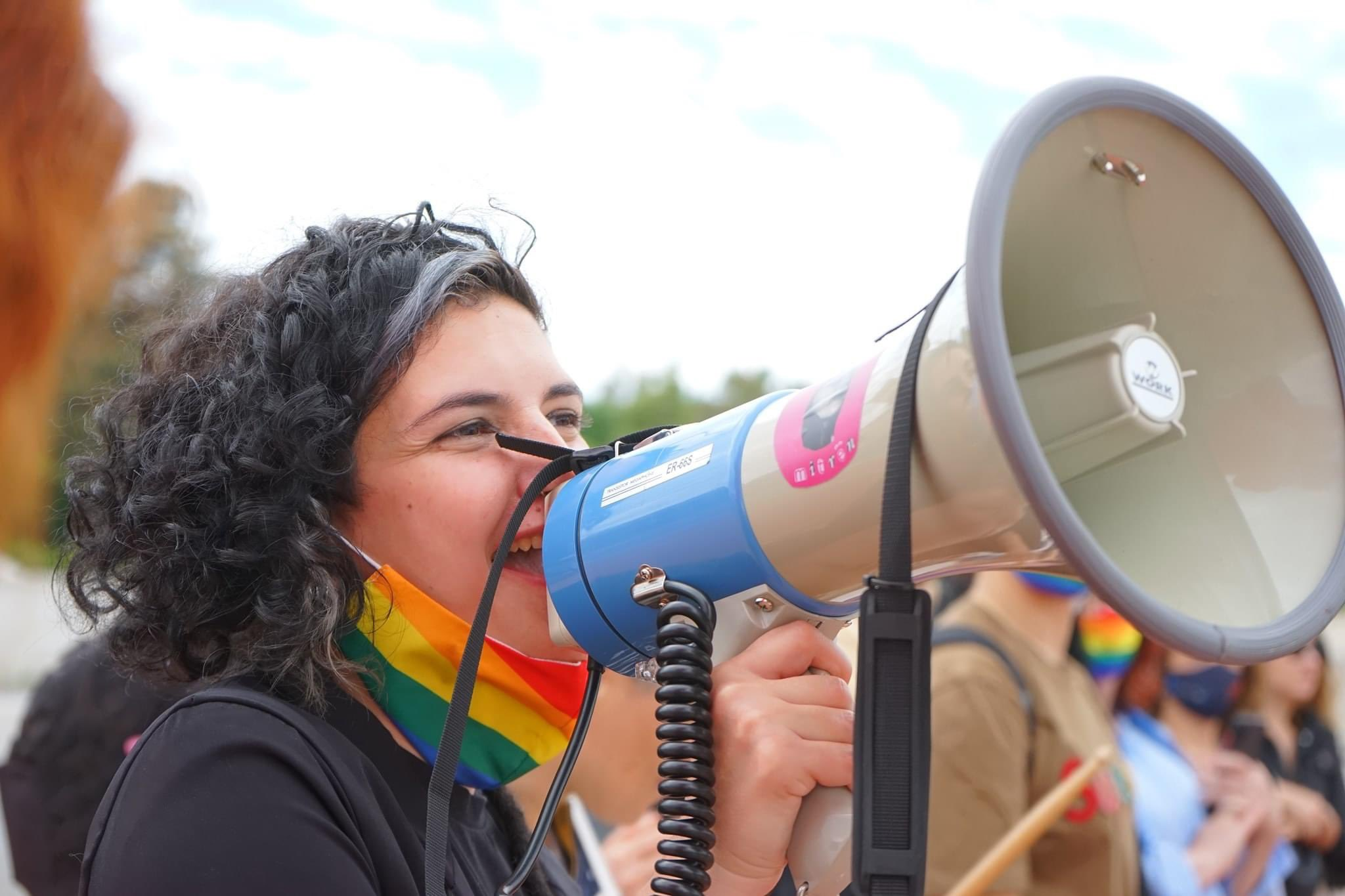
Karaj during activities marking IDAHOT in Tirana in 2021.

== Awards and recognitions ==
In 2022, Karaj was awarded the Civil Rights Defenders of the Year Award 2022, for her work for political and social change by advocating for political reforms, changing people's attitudes, and providing protection and a community for LGBTI+ persons in Albania.

== Personal life ==
Karaj was born and raised in a family with old roots in Tirana. She studied psychology at the College of Social Sciences at the University of Tirana.
