= Avokati i Popullit =

Ombudsman in Albania

People's Advocate
- Avokati i Popullit
- Albanian Ombudsman logo
- Incumbent; Endri Shabani since 19 December 2025
- Type: Ombudsman
- Formation: 4 February 1999
- Website: avokatipopullit.gov.al

The People's Advocate (Albanian: Avokati i Popullit) is the Albanian office of the ombudsman, a justice-advising entity to the public.

Established for the first time in the Albanian Constitution of 1998, it was enacted into law with minor amendments by the Albanian parliament on February 4, 1999.

The People's Advocate as an institution defends the rights, freedoms and lawful interests of individuals from unlawful and incorrect acts or omissions of public administration bodies as well as third parties acting on its behalf. It has as its mission the prevention of potential conflicts between the public administration and the individual. The Ombudsman acts on the basis of the complaint or request submitted to the office.

The people's advocate is elected by members of the Assembly on a three-fifths majority for a period of 5 years with the right for reelection.

== Ombudspersons ==
No.	Name	Term in office
1	Ermir Dobjani	16 February 2000	16 February 2010
2	Igli Totozani	22 December 2011	19 June 2017
3	Erinda Ballanca	19 June 2017	19 December 2025
4	Endri Shabani	19 December 2025	incumbent
