= Igli Totozani =

Albanian lawyer

2nd Ombudsman of Albania
- In office 22 December 2011 – 19 June 2017
- Preceded by: Ermir Dobjani
- Succeeded by: Erinda Ballanca

Personal details
- Born: February 18, 1973 (age 53) Tirana, Albania

Igli Totozani (born 18 February 1973, in Tirana) is an Albanian lawyer who served as Albania's second Ombudsman (Avokati i Popullit) from 2011 to 2017.

== Career ==
Totozani studied at the University of Geneva in Switzerland where he successfully defended his master's degree in European studies and Political science respectively. In 2001 he won the Jean Louis de Claparede Award from the University of Geneva. He has served as an Advisor to the Albanian Prime Minister on issues like Education and European Integration. In March 2016, Totozani was reelected as President of the Mediterranean Ombudsmans Association (AOM). He has been a vocal supporter for the rights of the LGBT community in Albania.
