= Outline of Albania =

Country in the Balkan Peninsula in Southeastern Europe

The Flag of Albania

The coat of arms of Albania

The location of Albania

Flagmap of Albania

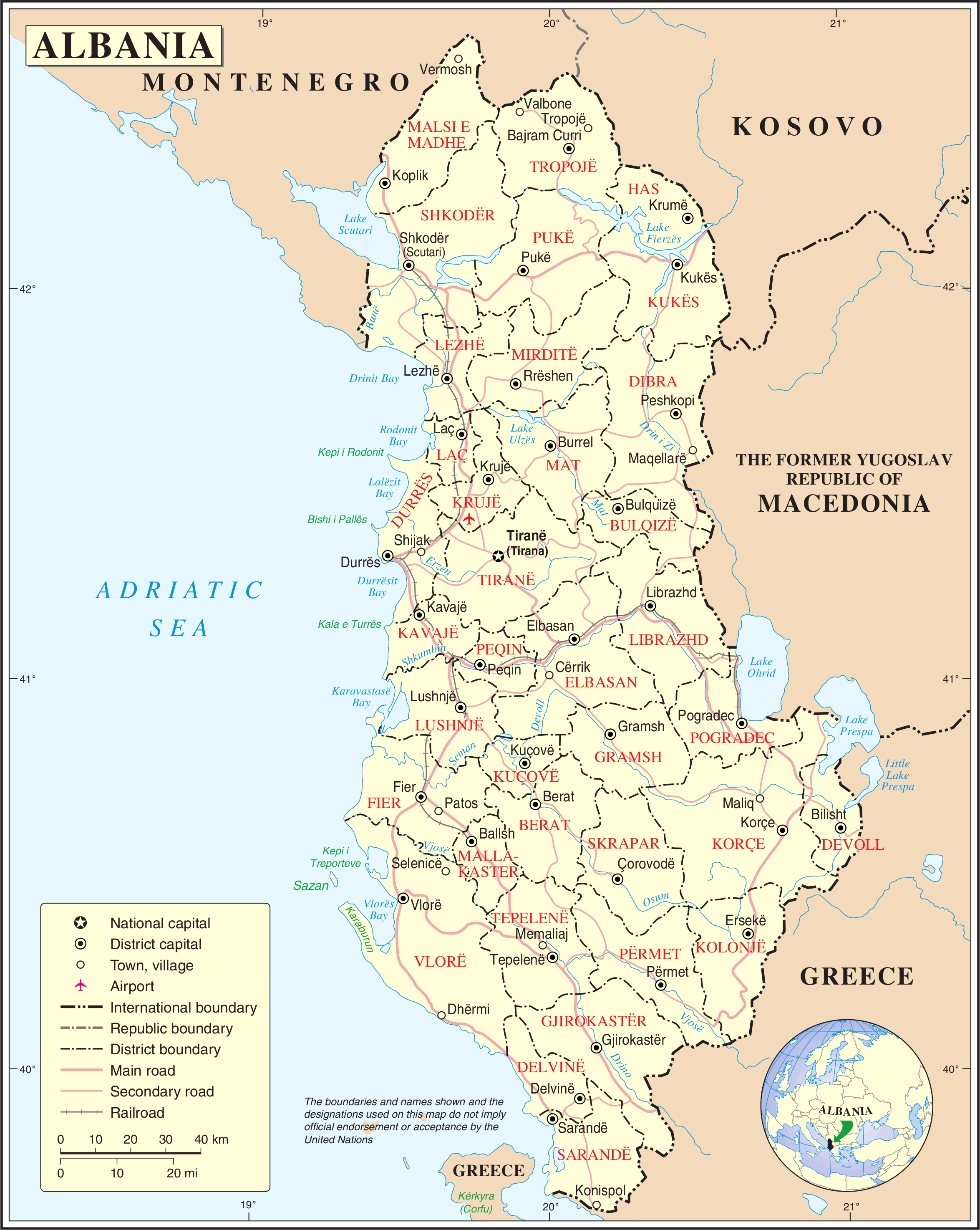
An enlargeable map of the Republic of Albania

The following outline is provided as an overview of and topical guide to Albania:

Albania, officially the Republic of Albania, is a country in Southeastern Europe. It is located in the Balkans, on the Adriatic and Ionian Seas within the Mediterranean Sea, and shares land borders with Montenegro to the northwest, Kosovo to the northeast, North Macedonia to the east and Greece to the south. With an area of 28,748 km^{2} (11,100 sq mi), it has a varied range of climatic, geological, hydrological and morphological conditions. Landscapes range from rugged snow-capped mountains in the Albanian Alps and the Korab, Skanderbeg, Pindus and Ceraunian Mountains, to fertile lowland plains extending from the Adriatic and Ionian sea coasts. Tirana is the capital and largest city, followed by Durrës, Vlorë, and Shkodër.

== General reference ==
An enlargeable basic map of Albania

- Pronunciation: /ælˈbeɪniə/ al-BAY-nee-ə
- Common English country name: Albania
- Official English country name: The Republic of Albania
- Common endonym(s): List of countries and capitals in native languages Shqipëria/Shqipëri, Shqipnia/Shqipni
- Official endonym(s): List of official endonyms of present-day nations and states Republika e Shqipërisë
- Adjectival(s): Albanian
- Demonym(s): Albanian (Albanian: Shqiptar)
- Etymology: Name of Albania
- International rankings of Albania
- ISO country codes: AL, ALB, 008
- ISO region codes: See ISO 3166-2:AL
- Internet country code top-level domain: .al

== Geography of Albania ==
An enlargeable topographic map of Albania

- Albania is: a country
- Location:
  - Eastern Hemisphere
  - Northern Hemisphere
    - Eurasia
      - Europe
        - Southern Europe
          - Balkans (also known as "Southeastern Europe")
  - Time zone: Central European Time (UTC+01), Central European Summer Time (UTC+02)
  - Extreme points of Albania
    - High: Maja e Korabit 2,764 m (9,068 ft)
    - Low: Adriatic Sea 0 m
  - Land boundaries: 717 km

Greece 282 km
Montenegro 172 km
North Macedonia 151 km
Kosovo 112 km

- Coastline: 362 km

- Population of Albania: 3,600,523 people (2007 estimate) - 130th most populous country
- Area of Albania: 28,748 km^{2} (11,100 mi^{2}) - 139th largest country
- Atlas of Albania

=== Environment of Albania ===
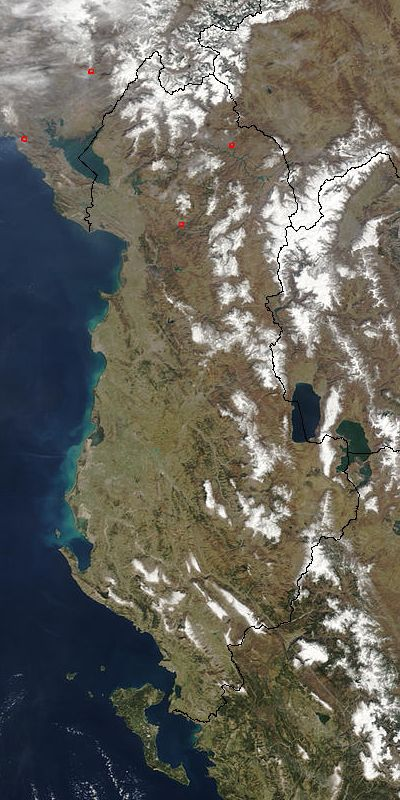
An enlargeable satellite image of Albania

- Climate of Albania
- Protected areas of Albania
  - National parks of Albania
- Wildlife of Albania
  - Fauna of Albania
    - Birds of Albania
    - Mammals of Albania

==== Natural geographic features of Albania ====
- Glaciers of Albania
- Islands of Albania
- Lakes of Albania
- Mountains of Albania
- Rivers of Albania
- World Heritage Sites in Albania

=== Regions of Albania ===
Regions of Albania

==== Ecoregions of Albania ====
List of ecoregions in Albania

==== Administrative divisions of Albania ====
- Counties of Albania
  - Municipalities of Albania
  - Communes of Albania
  - Villages of Albania

Counties of Albania

Albania is divided into twelve counties (Albanian: qarku, sing. qark (official term); but often prefektura, sing. prefekturë, sometimes translated as prefecture). Each contains several municipalities:

	County	Capital	Municipalities
1.	Berat	Berat	Berat, Kuçovë, Poliçan, Skrapar, Ura Vajgurore
2.	Dibër	Peshkopi	Bulqizë, Dibër, Klos, Mat
3.	Durrës	Durrës	Durrës, Krujë, Shijak
4.	Elbasan	Elbasan	Belsh, Cërrik, Elbasan, Gramsh, Librazhd, Peqin, Prrenjas
5.	Fier	Fier	Divjakë, Fier, Lushnjë, Mallakastër, Patos, Roskovec
6.	Gjirokastër	Gjirokastër	Dropull, Gjirokastër, Këlcyrë, Libohovë, Memaliaj, Përmet, Tepelenë
7.	Korçë	Korçë	Devoll, Kolonjë, Korçë, Maliq, Pogradec, Pustec
8.	Kukës	Kukës	Has, Kukës, Tropojë
9.	Lezhë	Lezhë	Kurbin, Lezhë, Mirditë
10.	Shkodër	Shkodër	Fushë-Arrëz, Malësi e Madhe, Pukë, Shkodër, Vau i Dejës
11.	Tirana	Tirana	Kamëz, Kavajë, Rrogozhinë, Tirana, Vorë
12.	Vlorë	Vlorë	Delvinë, Finiq, Himarë, Konispol, Sarandë, Selenicë, Vlorë

== Government and politics of Albania ==
Politics of Albania

- Form of government: parliamentary representative democratic republic
- Capital of Albania: Tirana
- Elections in Albania
- Political parties in Albania
- Political scandals of Albania
- Taxation in Albania

=== Branches of the government of Albania ===
Government of Albania

==== Executive branch of the government of Albania ====
- Head of state: President of Albania, Bajram Begaj
- Head of government: Prime Minister of Albania, Edi Rama
  - Deputy Prime Minister of Albania, Belinda Balluku
- Council of Ministers of Albania

==== Legislative branch of the government of Albania ====
- Parliament of Albania: Assembly of the Republic of Albania (unicameral)

==== Judicial branch of the government of Albania ====
Judicial system of Albania

- Constitutional Court of Albania
- Supreme Court of Albania
  - Administrative Courts in Albania
  - Appeals courts of Albania
    - District courts in Albania

=== Foreign relations of Albania ===
Foreign relations of Albania

- Albanian passport
- Diplomatic missions in Albania
- Diplomatic missions of Albania
- Albania–Kosovo relations
- Albanian-Greek relations

==== International organization membership ====
The Republic of Albania is a member of:

- Black Sea Economic Cooperation Zone (BSEC)
- Central European Initiative (CEI)
- Council of Europe (CE)
- Euro-Atlantic Partnership Council (EAPC)
- European Bank for Reconstruction and Development (EBRD)
- Food and Agriculture Organization (FAO)
- International Atomic Energy Agency (IAEA)
- International Bank for Reconstruction and Development (IBRD)
- International Civil Aviation Organization (ICAO)
- International Criminal Court (ICCt)
- International Criminal Police Organization (Interpol)
- International Development Association (IDA)
- International Federation of Red Cross and Red Crescent Societies (IFRCS)
- International Finance Corporation (IFC)
- International Fund for Agricultural Development (IFAD)
- International Labour Organization (ILO)
- International Maritime Organization (IMO)
- International Monetary Fund (IMF)
- International Olympic Committee (IOC)
- International Organization for Migration (IOM)
- International Organization for Standardization (ISO) (correspondent)
- International Red Cross and Red Crescent Movement (ICRM)
- International Telecommunication Union (ITU)
- International Trade Union Confederation (ITUC)
- Inter-Parliamentary Union (IPU)
- Islamic Development Bank (IDB)
- Multilateral Investment Guarantee Agency (MIGA)
- North Atlantic Treaty Organization (NATO)
- Organisation internationale de la Francophonie (OIF)
- Organisation of Islamic Cooperation (OIC)
- Organization for Security and Cooperation in Europe (OSCE)
- Organisation for the Prohibition of Chemical Weapons (OPCW)
- Southeast European Cooperative Initiative (SECI)
- United Nations (UN)
- United Nations Conference on Trade and Development (UNCTAD)
- United Nations Educational, Scientific, and Cultural Organization (UNESCO)
- United Nations Industrial Development Organization (UNIDO)
- United Nations Observer Mission in Georgia (UNOMIG)
- Universal Postal Union (UPU)
- World Customs Organization (WCO)
- World Federation of Trade Unions (WFTU)
- World Health Organization (WHO)
- World Intellectual Property Organization (WIPO)
- World Meteorological Organization (WMO)
- World Tourism Organization (UNWTO)
- World Trade Organization (WTO)

=== Law and order in Albania ===
- Capital punishment in Albania
- Constitution of Albania
- Crime in Albania
  - Albanian mafia
  - List of assassinations in Albania
- Human rights in Albania
  - LGBT rights in Albania
  - Women in Albania
  - Freedom of religion in Albania
- Law enforcement in Albania
  - Albanian Police
  - SHISH

=== Military of Albania ===
Military of Albania

- Command
  - Commander-in-chief: President of Albania
    - Ministry of Defence of Albania
      - Albanian Joint Forces Command
        - Rapid Reaction Brigade
        - Commando Regiment
        - Albanian Air Brigade
        - Albanian Navy Brigade
        - Area Support Brigade
      - Albanian Support Command
- Forces
  - Army of Albania
  - Navy of Albania
  - Air Force of Albania
  - Naval Forces of Albania
  - General Staff of the Armed Forces
  - Special forces of Albania
  - Weapons of mass destruction in Albania - None
- Military history of Albania
- Military ranks of Albania

=== Local government in Albania ===
Local government in Albania

== History of Albania ==
=== By period ===
- Origin of the Albanians
- Prehistory
  - Prehistoric Balkans
    - Illyria and Illyrians
- Ancient Albania
  - Illyricum (Roman province) (229 B.C.)
- Albania in the Middle Ages (4th - 12th century)
  - Barbarian invasions of Albania and the Early Middle Ages
  - Albania in the Early Middle Ages
  - Albania in the Late Middle Ages
- Ottoman era
  - History of Ottoman Albania (1385 - 1912)
  - Albania Veneta
- Albanian nationalism and independence (1912)
- History of Albania (1919–1939) (World War I, and the Great Depression era)
  - Principality of Albania (1914–1925)
  - Albanian Republic (1925–1928)
  - Kingdom of Albania (1928–39) (1928–1939)
- Military history of Albania during World War II
  - Italian invasion of Albania (1939)
  - Albania under Italy (1939–1943)
  - Albania under Nazi Germany (1943–1944)
  - Albanian Resistance of World War II
- History of Communist Albania (1944–1992)
  - Socialist People's Republic of Albania (1944–1992)
- History of post-Communist Albania (since 1992)
  - Accession of Albania to the European Union

=== By field ===
- Albanian sworn virgins
- Military history of Albania
  - Albania and weapons of mass destruction

== Culture of Albania ==
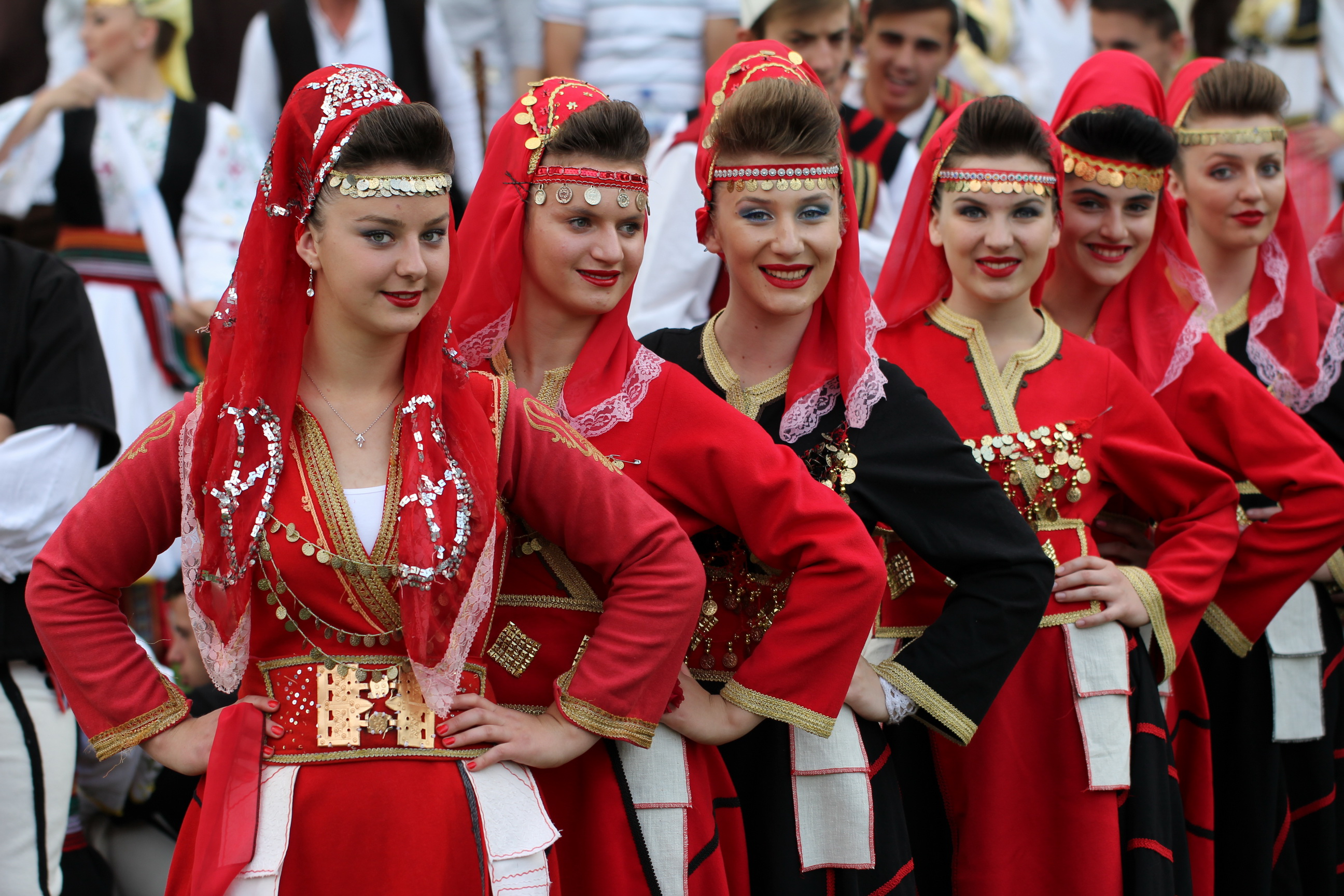
Albanian women dressed in traditional costumes at the Sofra Dardane festival in Bajram Curri

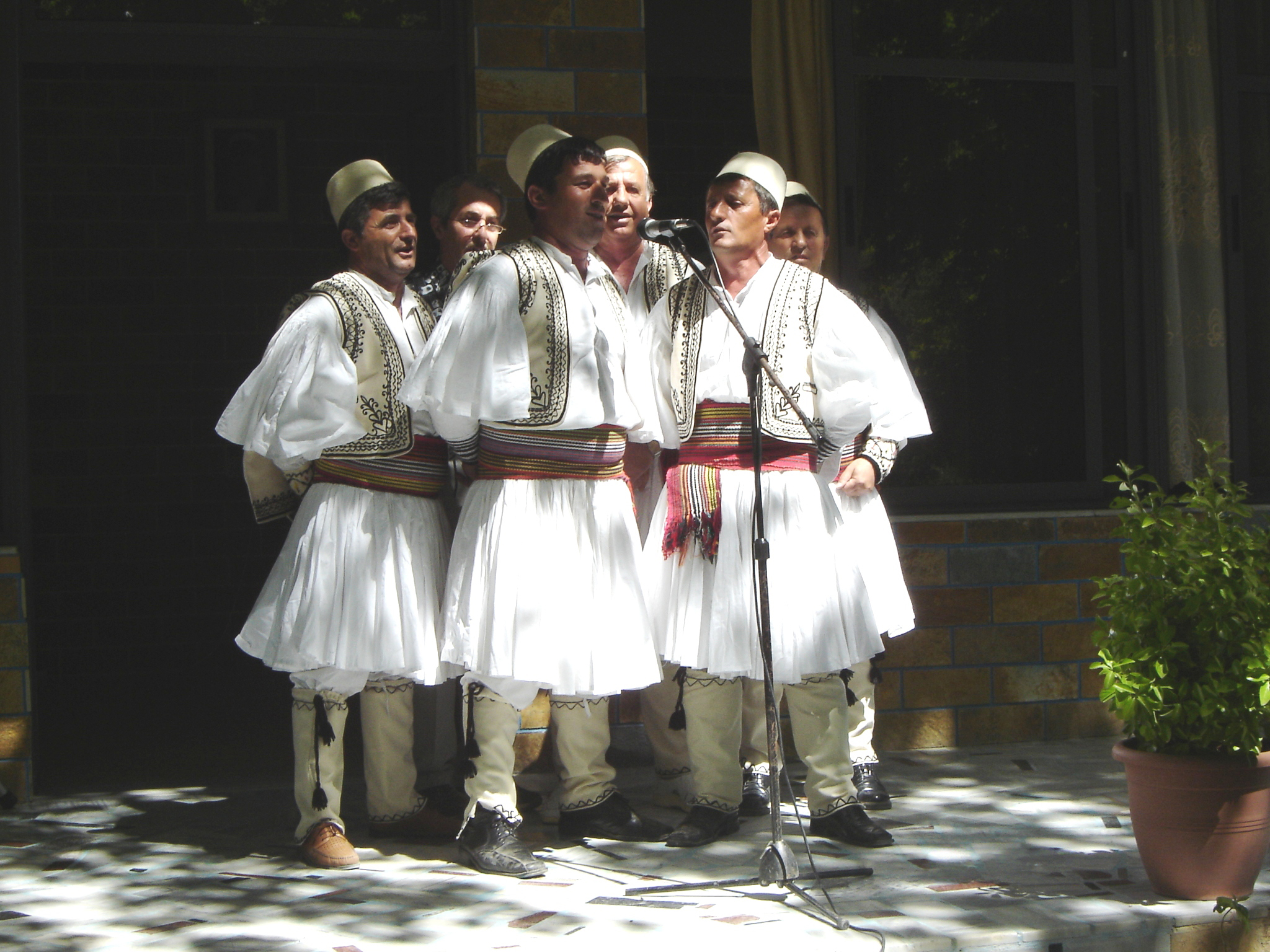
A traditional male folk group from Skrapar singing an iso-polyphonic song

- Architecture of Albania
- Cuisine of Albania
- Languages of Albania
  - Albanian language
- Media in Albania
- National symbols of Albania
  - Coat of arms of Albania
  - Flag of Albania
  - National anthem of Albania
- People of Albania
- Prostitution in Albania
- Public holidays in Albania
- Religion in Albania
  - Christianity in Albania
  - Islam in Albania
  - Judaism in Albania
- World Heritage Sites in Albania

=== Art in Albania ===
- Cinema of Albania
- Literature of Albania
- Music of Albania
- Television in Albania
- Theatre in Albania

=== Sports in Albania ===
- Albania at the Olympics
- Football in Albania
  - Albanian Football Association
  - Albania national football team
  - Albania national under-21 football team
  - Albanian Superliga

== Economy and infrastructure of Albania ==
- Economic rank, by nominal GDP (2007): 112th (one-hundred twelfth)
- Agriculture in Albania
- Banking in Albania
  - National Bank of Albania
  - Banks in Albania
- Communications in Albania
  - Internet in Albania
  - News in Albania
- Companies of Albania
- Currency of Albania: Lek
  - ISO 4217: ALL
- Energy in Albania
  - Energy in Albania
  - Energy policy of Albania
  - Oil industry in Albania
- Health care in Albania
- Mining in Albania
- Tirana Stock Exchange
- Tourism in Albania
- Visa policy of Albania
- Transport in Albania
  - Airports in Albania
  - Rail transport in Albania
    - Roads in Albania
    - Vehicle registration plates of Albania

== Education in Albania ==
- Academic grading in Albania
- Schools in Albania
- Universities in Albania

== See also ==
Albania

- List of international rankings
- Member state of the North Atlantic Treaty Organization
- Member state of the United Nations
