= CENADOJ =

Guatemalan government agency

The Centro Nacional de Análisis y Documentación Judicial (National Center for Judicial Analysis and Documentation, CENADOJ), is a judicial-support entity located in Guatemala (Central Latin America). A government entity, it works as part of the Judicial Branch of Guatemala (Organismo Judicial de Guatemala).

It was created through Agreement 037/002 of the Presidency of the Judicial Branch on June 17, 2002. The main office, originally located in the ground floor of the Palace of Justice, were inaugurated February 11, 2003, and the Center started functioning March 3 of that same year. In 2012 the main offices of CENADOJ were transferred to the top floor of the Center of Labor Justice (Centro de Justicia Laboral).

The CENADOJ is a technical body whose purpose is to support the jurisdictional activity with the pick up, selection, ordering, analysis and treatment, edition, publication and dissemination of legislative, jurisprudencial and legal doctrine information.

== Specific purposes ==
- To compile information to produce the statistics of the judicial sentences of the courts of the Republic, processing it to analyze the results of the jurisdictional management.
- To emit and to spread statistical information of the jurisdictional management.
- To take care of the necessities of information in the matter of jurisprudence, legislation and indoctrinates, for the support of the jurisdictional function of the magistrates, judicial judges and aids.

== Structure of the CENADOJ ==
The center is integrated by the following areas:

- Legislation and Jurisprudence: Its intent is to compile, classify, analyze and to include in the database the legal dispositions and the sentences, to process the edition, diffusion and publication of the laws, the jurisprudence and indoctrinates; as well as to maintain updated this information, in documentary and computer science means.
- Judicial Documentation: Its intention is to take care of and to satisfy the necessities with documentary legal information (jurisprudence, legislation, indoctrinate). It is an area oriented fundamentally towards the attention of internal and external users. This area also oversees the judicial libraries belonging to CENADOJ.
- Publications: Its purpose is to generate the criteria necessary to guide and to coordinate the work of pick up, selection, programming, development, edition, production and distribution of publications in legal matter and other matters that are important, of interest and support so that the justice operators extend and can update the necessary knowledge for the development of their jurisdictional activity, as well as other external actors of the system.
- Central Registry of Detainees (RECEDE):Its main function is to collect, organize and update information on detainees, place of detention and place of transfer to provide it in a timely manner .
- Center for Arms and Ammunition Control (CECAM): : Its primary objective is the recording and tracking of data on arms and ammunition subject to legal proceedings. Maintains a systematized information, which can be provided to the authorities, as well as persons entitled to obtain them.

From 2003 to 2014, the center also had an Statistics branch for the compilation and analysis of statistical data relative to the activities of the courts and other auxiliary and administrative dependencies of the Judicial Branch, guarding by the security in the handling of the information. The Statistics branch was fused with another entity called CIDEJ.

== Services ==
- Information on different laws is provided by phone, fax, email or personally at the center.
- Reproduction of legislation and sentences by the Supreme Court of Justice and/or the Judicial Branch
- Providing printed and digital publications, reproduction that showcases the statistical, legal, and legislative information produced by the center.

== Publications ==
- Sumario del Diario de Centro América
- Resumen Mensual
- CENADOJ en Cifras
- OJ en Cifras
- Revista Jurídica
- Criterios Jurisprudenciales
- Gaceta de los Tribunales
- Gaceta de los Tribunales de Trabajo y Previsión Social

== Former publications ==
- Informador Bibliotecario
- Informador Bibliotecario Mensual
- Boletines Estadísticos
- CDs with the compilation of the Gaceta de los Tribunales from 1972 till 2001.

== Information available for consultation ==
The CENADOJ archives contain over 97,000 judicial norms, which include congressional decrees and accords by the Supreme Court and the Constitutional Court. Also included are Governmental, Ministerial, and Municipal accords, among others, considering their use, reforms, and derogations. The Center also offers a digital index of laws, each with a brief description.
