= Indoctrination =

Inculcating ideas in a person

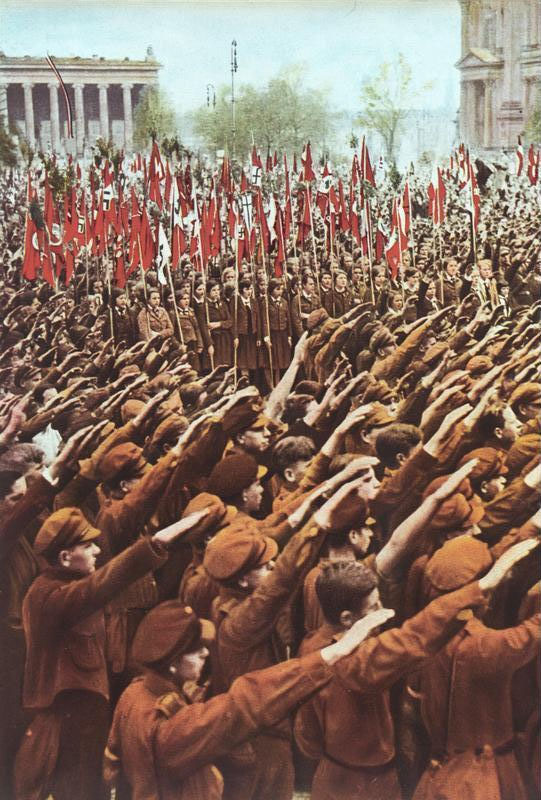
Hitler Youth members performing the Nazi salute at a rally at the Lustgarten in Berlin, 1933

Indoctrination is the process of inculcating (teaching by repeated instruction) a person or people into an ideology, often avoiding critical analysis. The term often implies brainwashing.

The indoctrination can be channeled through politicization of education and the media. Indoctrination can be distinguished from education on the basis that the indoctrinated person is expected not to question or critically examine the doctrine they have learned. As such the term may be used pejoratively or as a buzz word, often in the context of political opinions, theology, religious dogma or anti-religious convictions.

Common vectors of indoctrination include the state, educational institutions, religions, the arts, culture, and the media. Understood as a process of socialization into "ideal-type" citizens, indoctrination takes place under both democratic and authoritarian systems of government.

== Political context ==
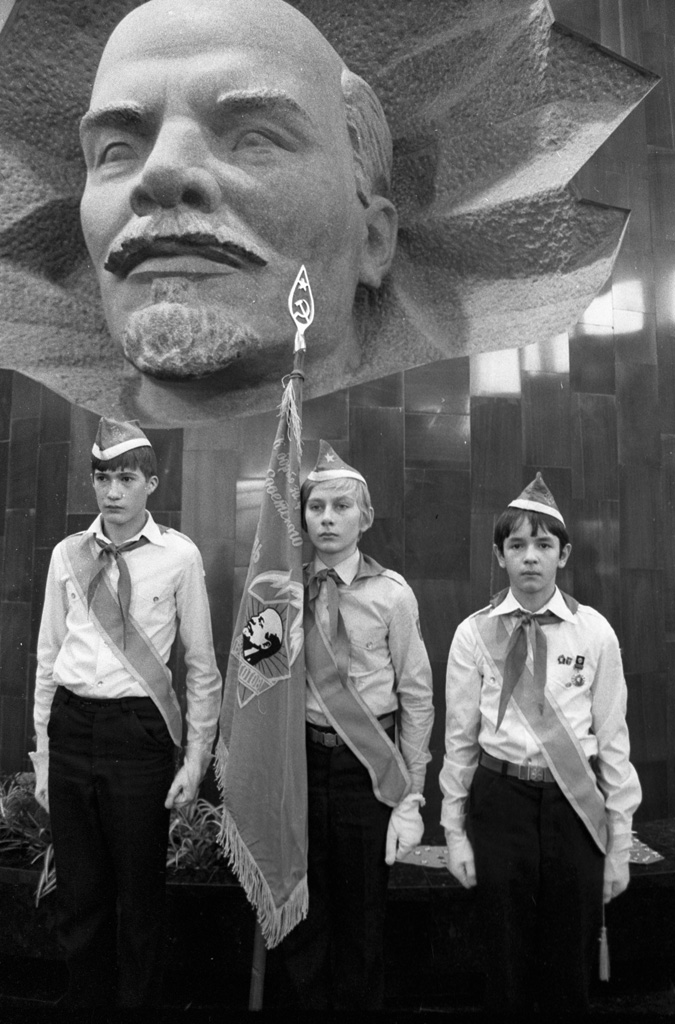
"Young Pioneer guards of honor". Moscow, 1984

In the political context, indoctrination is often analyzed as a tool of class warfare, where institutions of the state are identified as "conspiring" to maintain the status quo. The public educational system, the police, and mental health establishment are commonly cited as means of public pacification. In the extreme, an entire state can be implicated. For example, the Nazi influence in Germany during World War II is an instance of government indoctrination through all forms of public life, including education, politics, and culture. Following World War II, democratic nations sought to counteract the Nazi indoctrination in Germany through the process of re-education, mobilizing education as a way to reinstate new ideas of democracy and Western ideals. The process of American re-education included initiatives for the denazification of American-occupied Germany that also resulted in the indoctrination of German society with a "collective guilt phenomenon" to take accountability for World War II. Opinions differ on whether other forms of government are less doctrinaire, or merely achieve the same ends through less obvious methods.

== Religious indoctrination ==
Religious indoctrination, the original sense of indoctrination, refers to a process of imparting doctrine in an authoritative way, as in catechism. Most religious groups among the revealed religions instruct new members in the principles of the religion; this is now not usually referred to as indoctrination by the religions themselves, in part because of the negative connotations the word has acquired. Mystery religions require a period of indoctrination before granting access to esoteric knowledge. Some secular critics believe that all religions indoctrinate their adherents, as children, and the accusation is made in the case of religious extremism. Sects such as Scientology use personality tests and peer pressures to indoctrinate new members. Some religions have commitment ceremonies for children 13 years and younger, such as Bar Mitzvah, Confirmation, and Shichi-Go-San. In Buddhism, temple boys are encouraged to follow the faith while young. Some critics of religion, such as Richard Dawkins, maintain that the children of religious parents are often unfairly indoctrinated.

== Ideological indoctrination ==
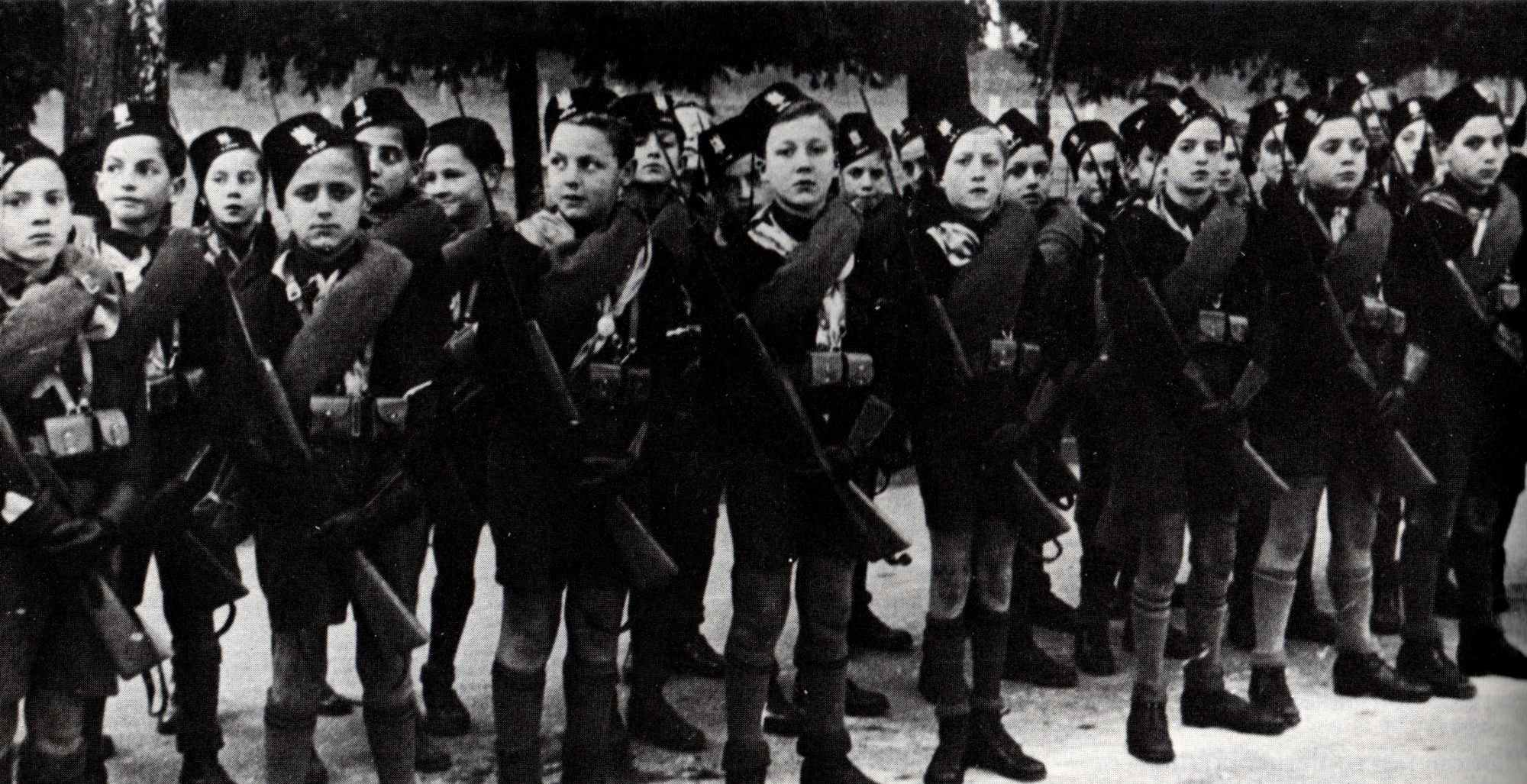
Members of the Opera Nazionale Balilla, a Fascist youth organization in Italy, 1930s

Indoctrination can occur in non-religious or anti-religious contexts. For example, during the 20th Century, the former People's Socialist Republic of Albania and the former Soviet Union instituted programs of government-sponsored atheistic indoctrination in order to promote state atheism, specifically Marxist–Leninist atheism, within their citizenry. Sabrina P. Ramet, a professor of political science, documented that "from kindergarten onward children [were] indoctrinated with an aggressive form of atheism" and "to denounce parents who follow religious practices at home." However, after the death of Albania's leader, Enver Hoxha in 1985, his successor, Ramiz Alia, adopted a relatively tolerant stance toward religious practice, referring to it as "a personal and family matter". Émigré clergymen were permitted to reenter the country in 1988 and officiate at religious services. Mother Teresa, an ethnic Albanian, visited Tirana in 1989, where she was received by the foreign minister and by Hoxha's widow. In December 1990, the ban on religious observance was officially lifted, in time to allow thousands of Christians to attend Christmas services (see Freedom of religion in Albania).

Similarly, in the former Soviet Union, "science education [in] Soviet schools [was] used as a vehicle for atheistic indoctrination", with teachers being instructed to prepare their course "so as to conduct anti-religious educations at all times", in order to comport with state-sanctioned Marxist–Leninist values. However, in 1997, several years after the fall of the Soviet Union, the Russian government passed a law recognizing religion as being important to Russian history with Orthodox Christianity (Russian: Православие Pravoslaviye), Russia's traditional and largest religion, declared a part of Russia's "historical heritage".

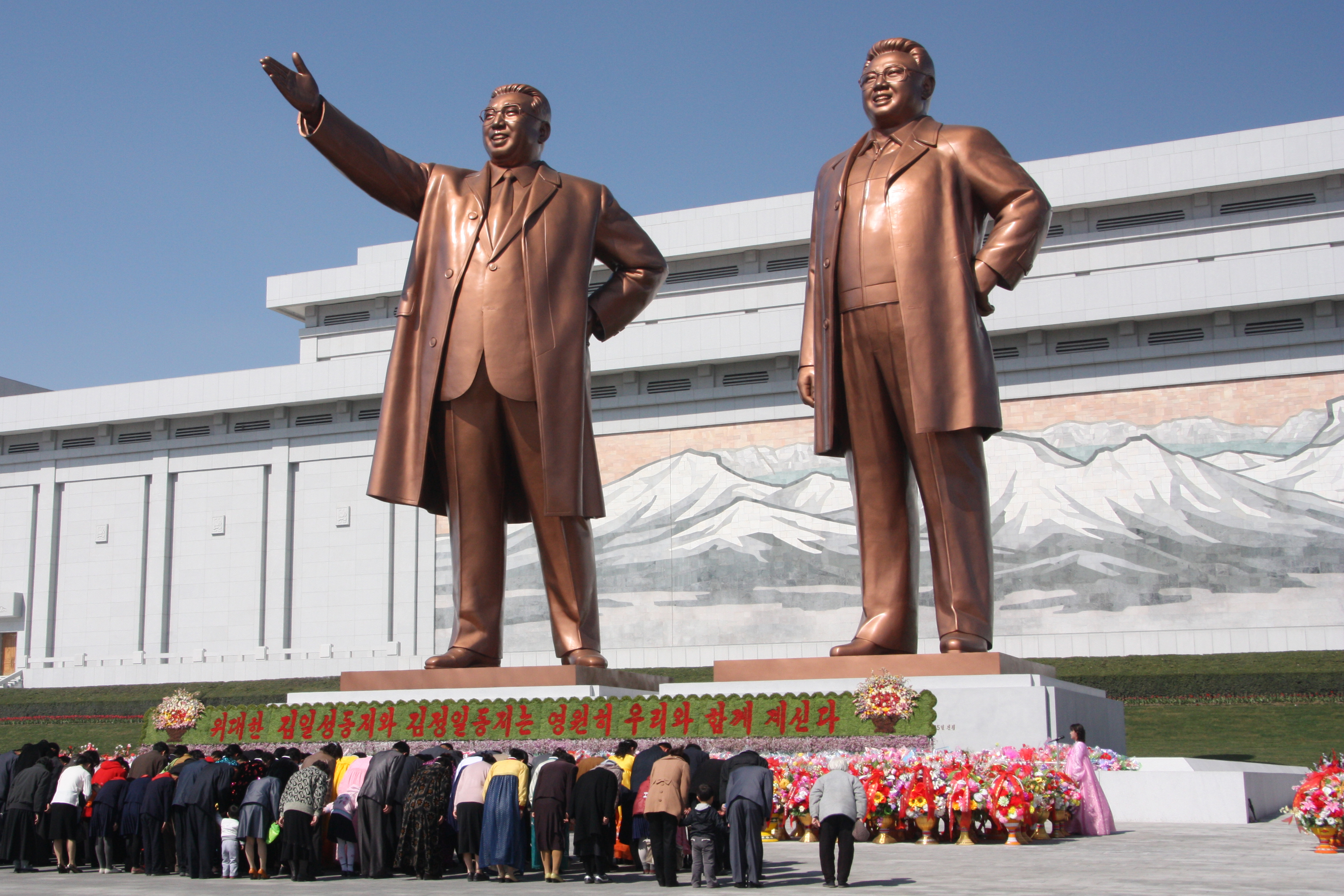
North Korean visitors bow before the bronze statues of Kim Il Sung and Kim Jong Il at the Mansu Hill Grand Monument in Pyongyang.

Ideological indoctrination is also a contemporary issue in the United States public education system, specifically in the realm of social science instruction. However, ideological indoctrination may take different forms than the implantation of certain ideas into education or instruction. For example, in this case, indoctrination through education occurs through the process of limiting instruction and "allowing diverse social institutions to control educational philosophy and procedure". For example, this has been seen through changes with required course concepts in social studies curriculum and the state-restriction of participatory civic education as a result of Senate Bill 3 from the Texas State Legislature in 2021, interfering with the "rights of the learner".

== Contemporary examples ==
In October 2025, media outlets reported that Rabbi Shalom Ber Sorotzkin, head of the Ateret Shlomo network of yeshivas in Israel, led thousands of underaged students in a demonstration outside Military Prison to protest the arrest of a yeshiva student who refused conscription. The children were seated wearing yellow symbols associated with Israeli hostages held in Gaza. Critics from Hostage and Missing Families Forum described the event as the use of minors for political or ideological messaging.

The UK's Supreme Court held in November 2025 that the provision of religious education in schools "in a manner which was not objective, critical, and pluralistic" was equivalent to indoctrination, ruling that "the concepts are two sides of the same coin".

== See also ==
- Acculturation
- Behavior modification
- Brainwashing
- Conversion therapy
- Ideology
- Indoctrinate U
- Pensée unique
- Radicalization
- Recruitment
- Groupthink
