= International rankings of Albania =

These are the international rankings of Albania.

== Demographics ==
- Population 2016 ranked 137 out of 196 countries
- Life expectancy 2016 ranked 37 out of 183 countries

== Economy ==
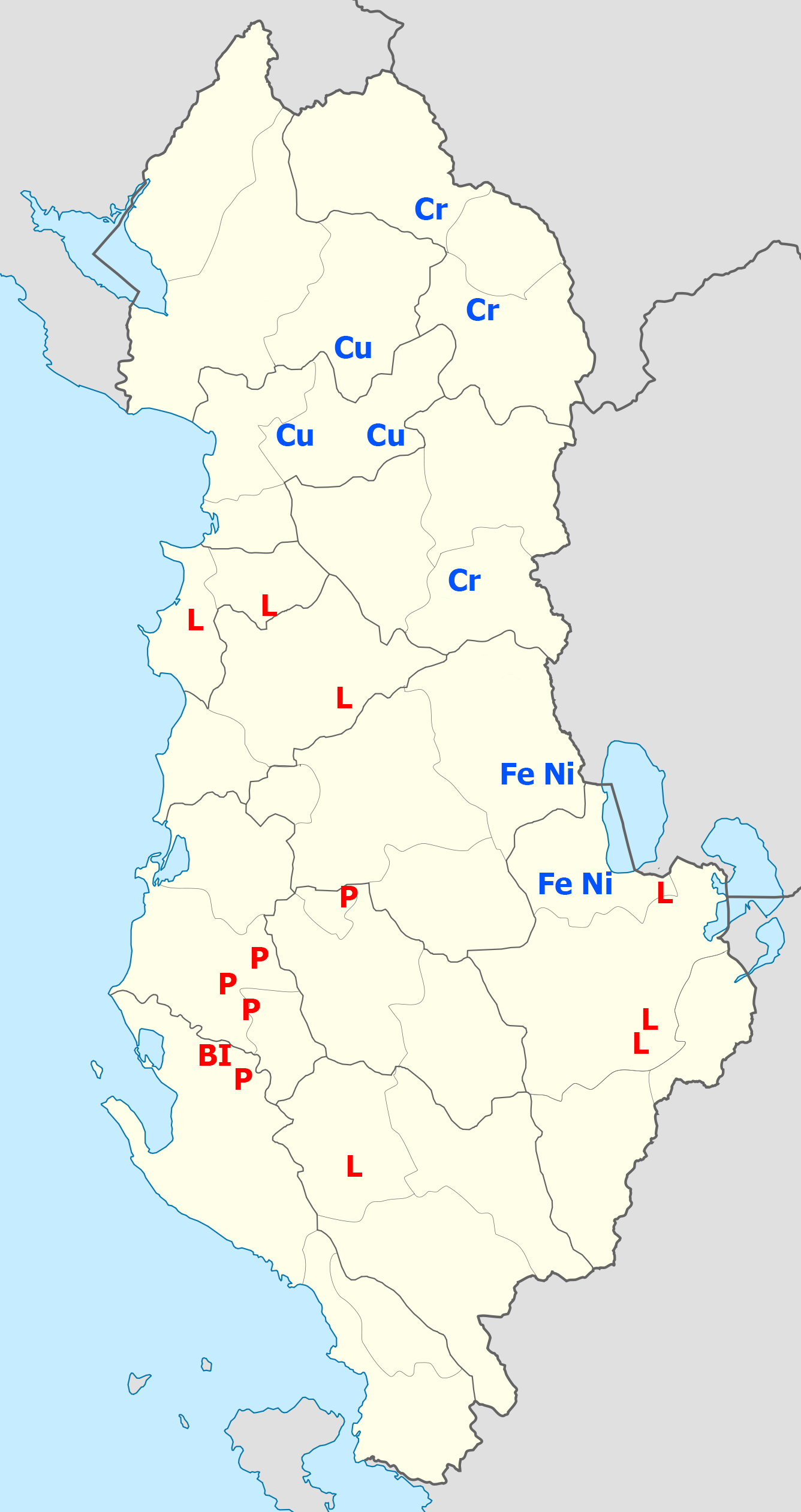
Natural resources of Albania. Metals are in blue (Cr, Fe, Ni, Cu), fossil fuels are in red (L – lignite, P – petroleum, BI – bitumen).

=== Macroeconomic indicators ===
GDP (PPP): $66.29 billion (2026)

GDP per capita (PPP): $28,378 (2026)

country comparison to the world: 122

GDP – real growth rate: 3.61% (2026)

country comparison to the world: 68

Inflation: 2.90% (2026)

country comparison to the world: 132

Unemployment: 8.30% (2026)

country comparison to the world: 74

=== Agriculture ===
Products: milk, maize, tomatoes, potatoes, watermelons, wheat, grapes, cucumbers, onions, apples

=== Foreign trade ===
Exports of Albania by product category (2019) Chemical products Transportation Machines Mineral products Plastics and rubbers Metals Foodstuffs Precious metals Textiles Instruments Animal products Vegetable products Paper goods Footwear and headwear Miscellaneous Stone and glass Wood products Animal and vegetable bi-products Animal hides Arts and antiques Weapons

Top export destinations by dollar (2024): Italy ($1.75 billion), Serbia ($485.24 million), Greece ($251.79 million), Germany ($236.51 million), and Spain ($139.61 million).

Top import items (2024): Refined Petroleum ($807 million), Cars ($678 million), Packaged Medicaments ($243 million), Raw Iron and Steel Bars ($156 million) and Electricity ($147 million).

Top import origins by dollar (2014): Italy ($100.38 billion), Greece ($41300 million), Turkey ($31500 million), China ($27800 million) and Germany ($23500 million).

Import partners (2024): Italy 21.1%, China 10.9%, Turkey 10.8%, Greece 7.6%, Germany 7.2%, Serbia 4.2%.

Remittances: ~$1.5 billion (2024)

Electricity – production by source:

- hydro: 90.5% (2024)

Natural gas

- production: 55 million m^{3} (2024-2025 est.)
- consumption: 55 million m^{3} (2024- 2025 est.)
- exports: 0 cu m (2024 est.)
- imports: 0 cu m (2024 est.)
- proven reserves: 5.692 billion m^{3} (2012 est)

=== Exchange rates ===
- Lekë per US dollar: 98.7 (2024), 103.51 (2020), 125.4 (2017), 79.546 (2008), 92.668 (2007), 98.384 (2006), 102.649 (2005), 102.78 (2004), 121.863 (2003), 140.155 (2002), 143.485 (2001), 143.709 (2000), 137.691 (1999)

== Education ==
- Education Index ranked 77 out of 181 countries.
- Programme for International Student Assessment 2015,
  - Maths ranked 56 out of 74.
  - Sciences ranked 52 out of 74.
  - Reading ranked 62 out of 74.
- Literacy rate 2015 ranked 20 out of 190 countries.

== Environment ==
- Yale University: Environmental Sustainability Index 2005, ranked 24 out of 146 countries.
- Environmental Performance Index 2012, 15 of 132 countries.
- Environmental Performance Index 2012 by Trend EPI 2012, 4 of 132 countries.
- South Pacific Applied Geoscience Commission and United Nations Environment Program: Environmental Vulnerability Index, ranked 158 out of 234 countries.

== Military ==
- Institute for Economics and Peace / EIU: Global Peace Index 2016, ranked 54 out of 163 countries

== Politics ==
- Corruption Perceptions Index 2015 ranked 83 out of 167 countries.
- Press Freedom Index 2016 ranked 82 out of 180 countries.
- Freedom of the Press 2009 ranked 50 out of 98 countries.
- Democracy Index 2015 ranked 81 out of 167 countries.

== Society ==
- University of Leicester 2006 Satisfaction with Life Index ranked 157 out of 178
- New Economics Foundation 2009 Happy Planet Index ranked 54 out of 143.
- World Economic Forum: Global Gender Gap Report 2015 ranked 70 out of 140 countries.

== Sport ==
- FIFA World Rankings: highest was 22nd in August 2015.

== Tourism ==
- World Tourism Organization: World Tourism rankings 2008, not ranked among top 50
- World Economic Forum: Travel and Tourism Competitiveness Report 2009, ranked 90 out of 133 countries

== Technology ==
- List of countries by number of Internet users 2011, ranked 99 out of 193 countries.
- World Intellectual Property Organization: Global Innovation Index 2026, ranked 79 out of 139 countries.
