= List of ecoregions in Albania =

Balkan mixed forests

Dinaric Mountains mixed forests

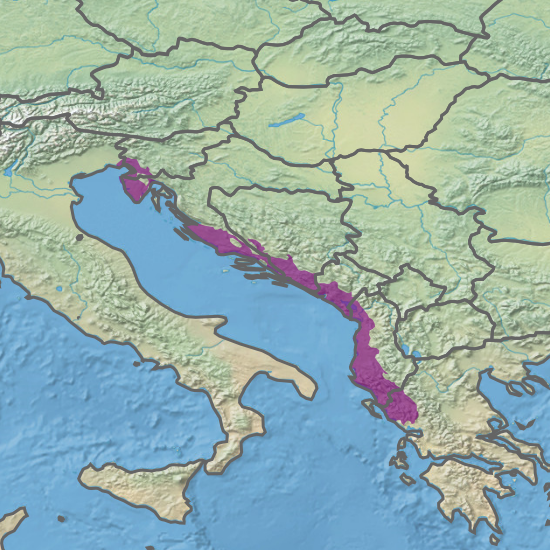
Illyrian deciduous forests

Pindus Mountains mixed forests

The following is a list of ecoregions in Albania defined by the World Wide Fund for Nature (WWF).

== Ecoregions ==
Temperate broadleaf and mixed forests

- Balkan mixed forests (Albania, Bosnia and Herzegovina, Bulgaria, North Macedonia, Serbia, Romania, Greece, Kosovo and Turkey)
- Dinaric Mountains mixed forests (Albania, Bosnia and Herzegovina, Croatia, Italy, Kosovo, Montenegro, Serbia, Slovenia)

Mediterranean forests, woodlands, and shrub

- Illyrian deciduous forests (Albania, Bosnia and Herzegovina, Croatia, Greece, Italy, Montenegro, Slovenia)
- Pindus Mountains mixed forests (Greece, North Macedonia, Albania, Kosovo)

== Gallery ==
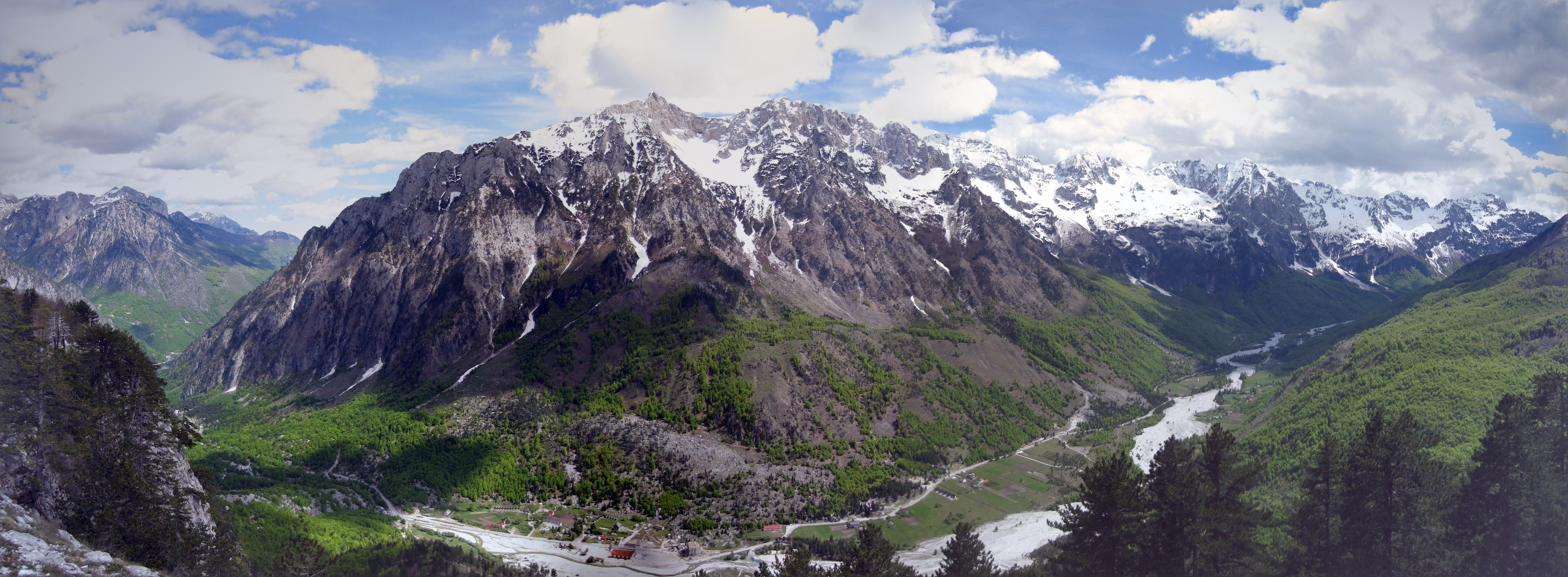
The Albanian Alps represent a major geomorphological part of Albania. It is the southernmost continuation of the Dinaric Alps, which extend along the Adriatic Sea from the Julian Alps in the northwest down to the Albanian Alps in the southeast.

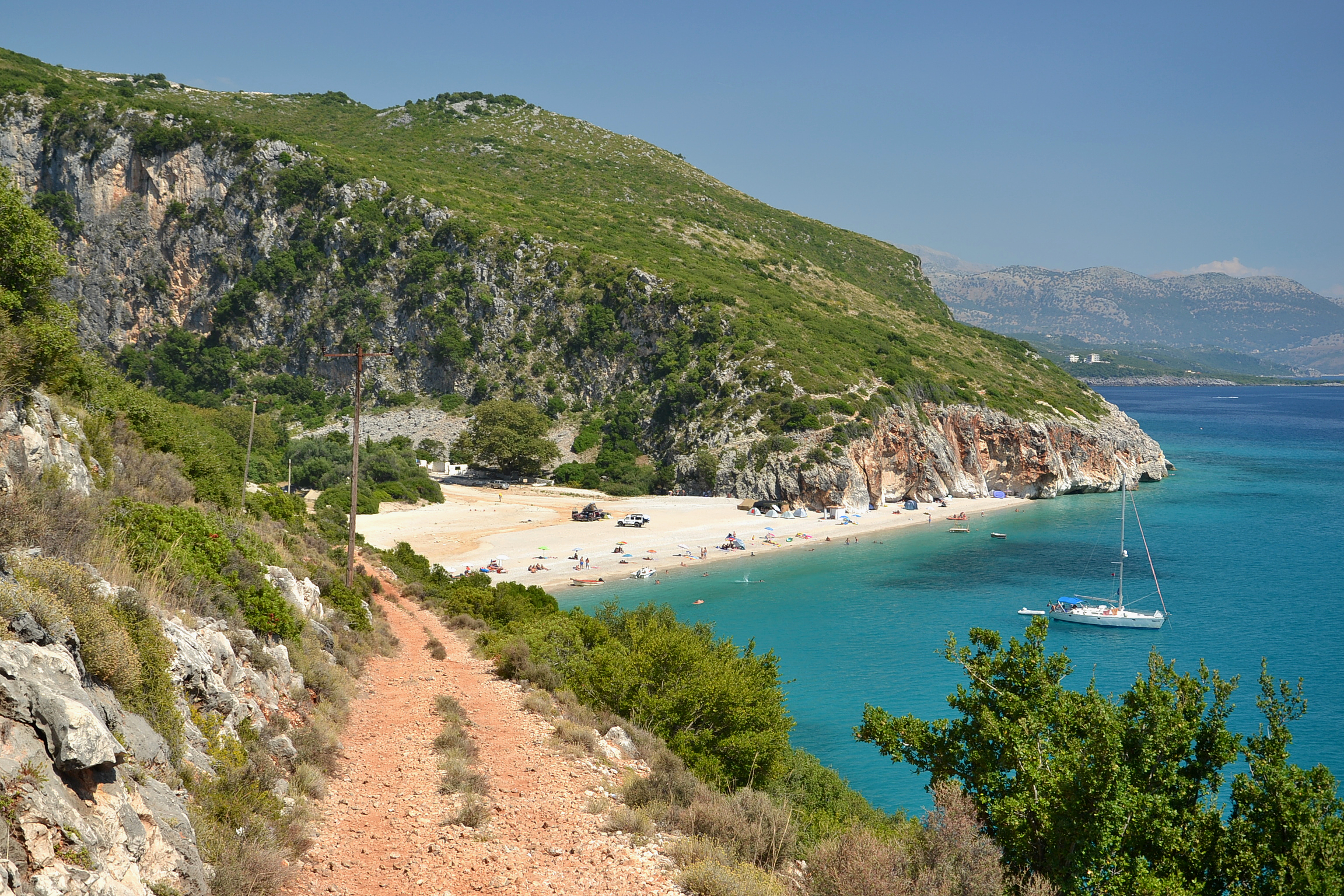
The Albanian Adriatic and Ionian Sea coastlines are dotted with many ecosystems of an immense significance such as rocky coasts, lagoons, wetlands, sand dunes, river deltas, hydrophilic and hydrophobic forests.

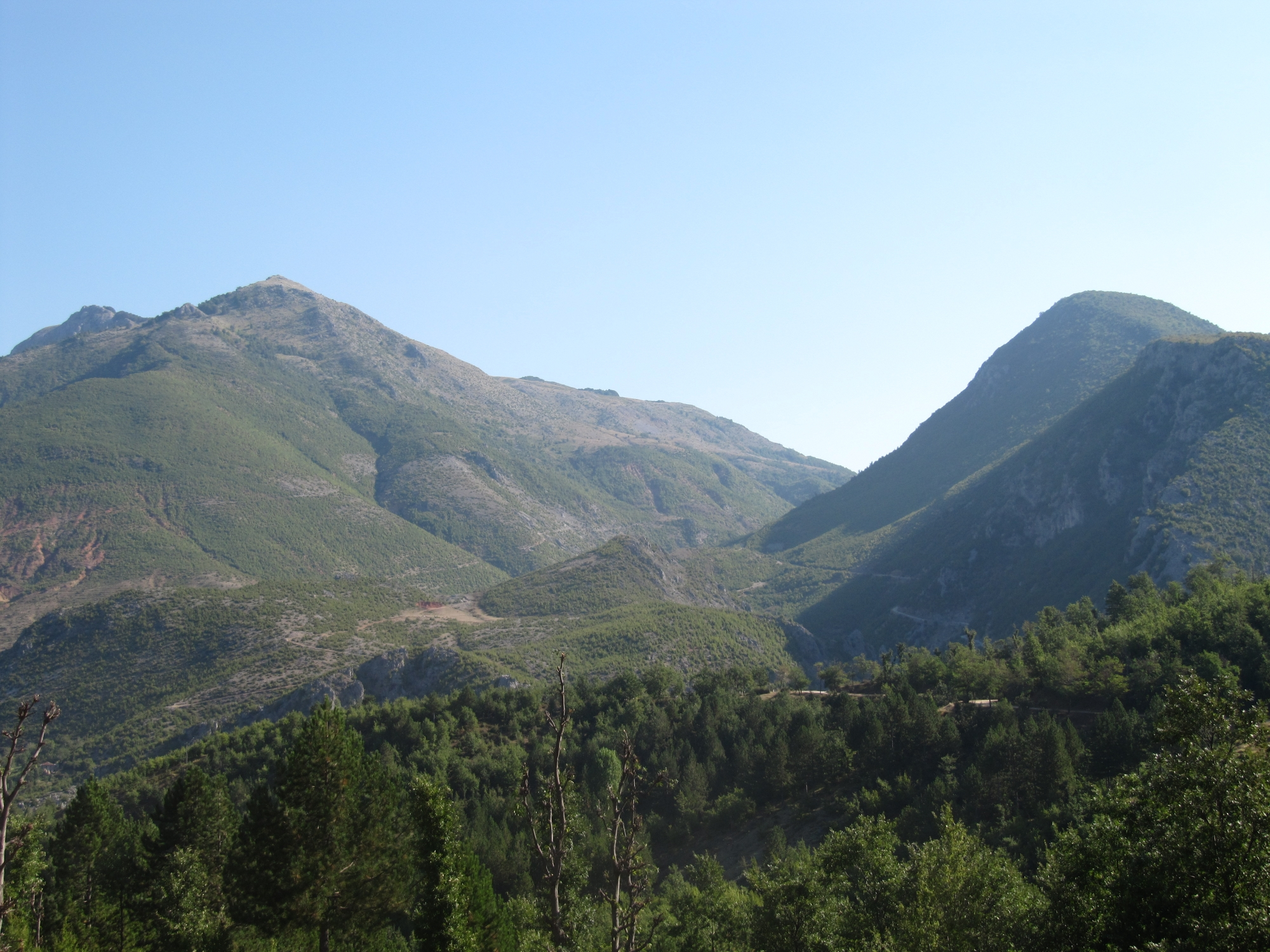
The forests of Rrajcë and Gashi River are part of the Ancient and Primeval Beech Forests of the Carpathians UNESCO World Heritage Site due to the extraordinary value of these forests.

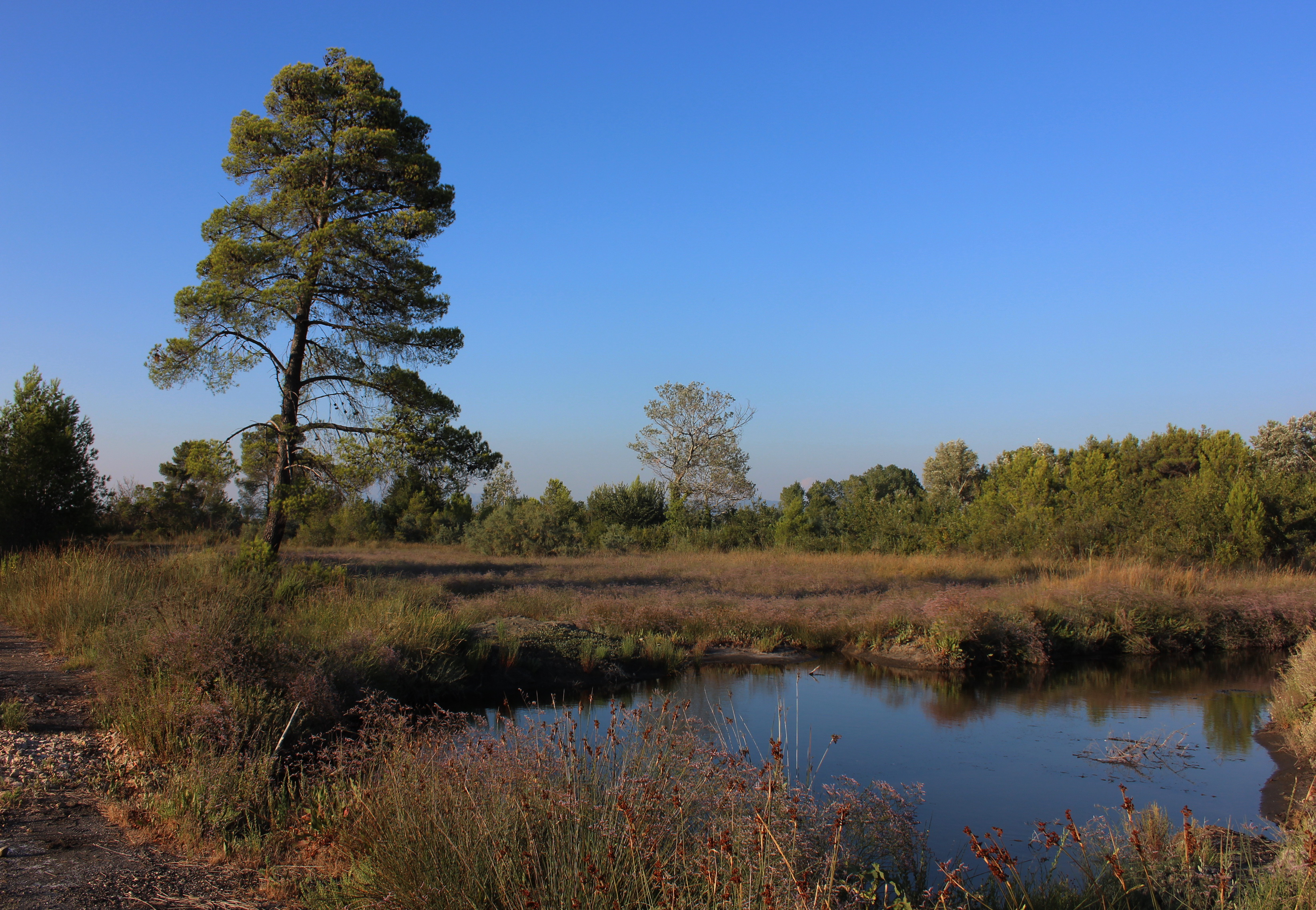
The main lagoon banks and islands of Patoku are covered by salt marsh scrubs.

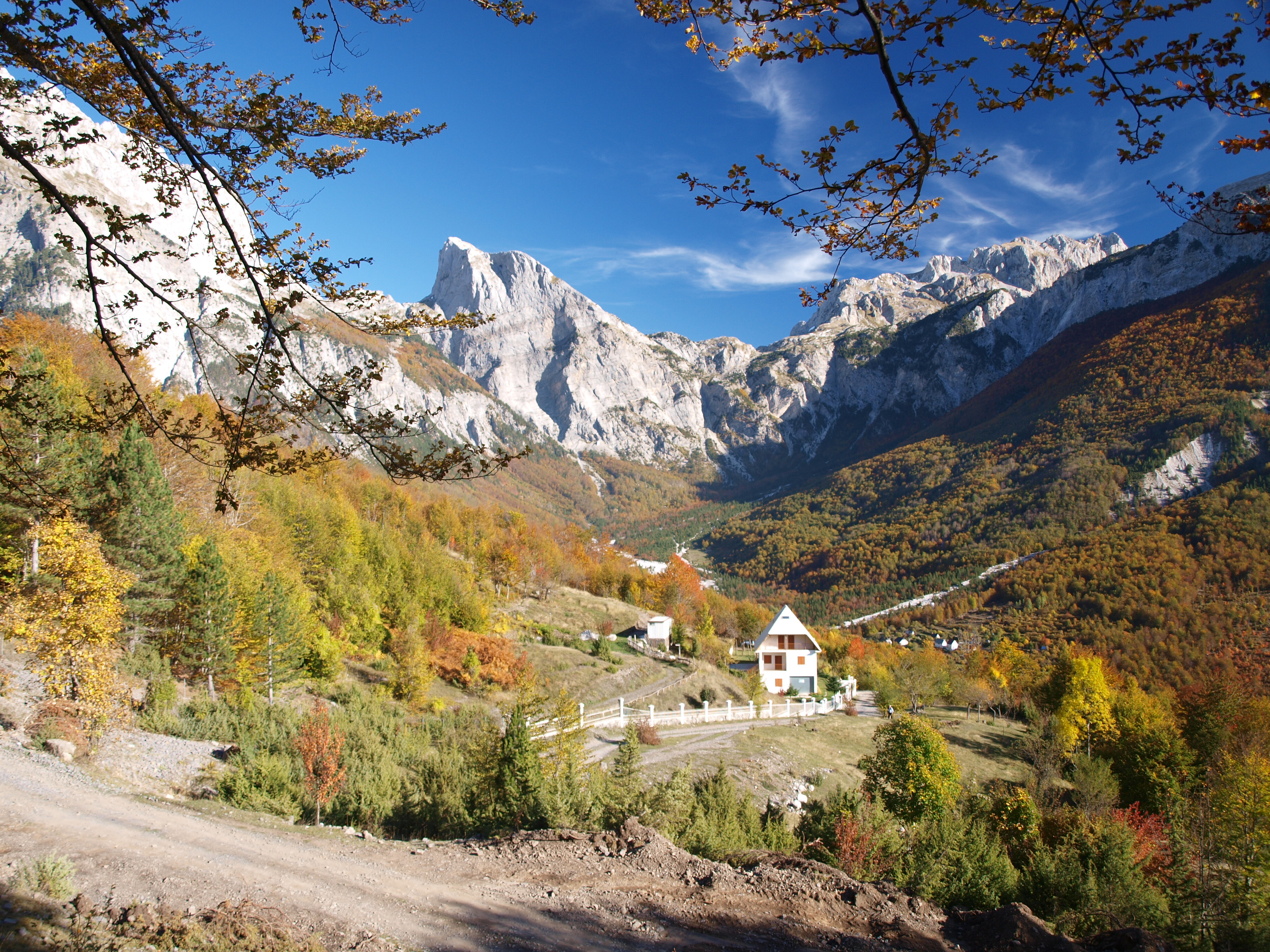
Theth National Park
21 November 1966

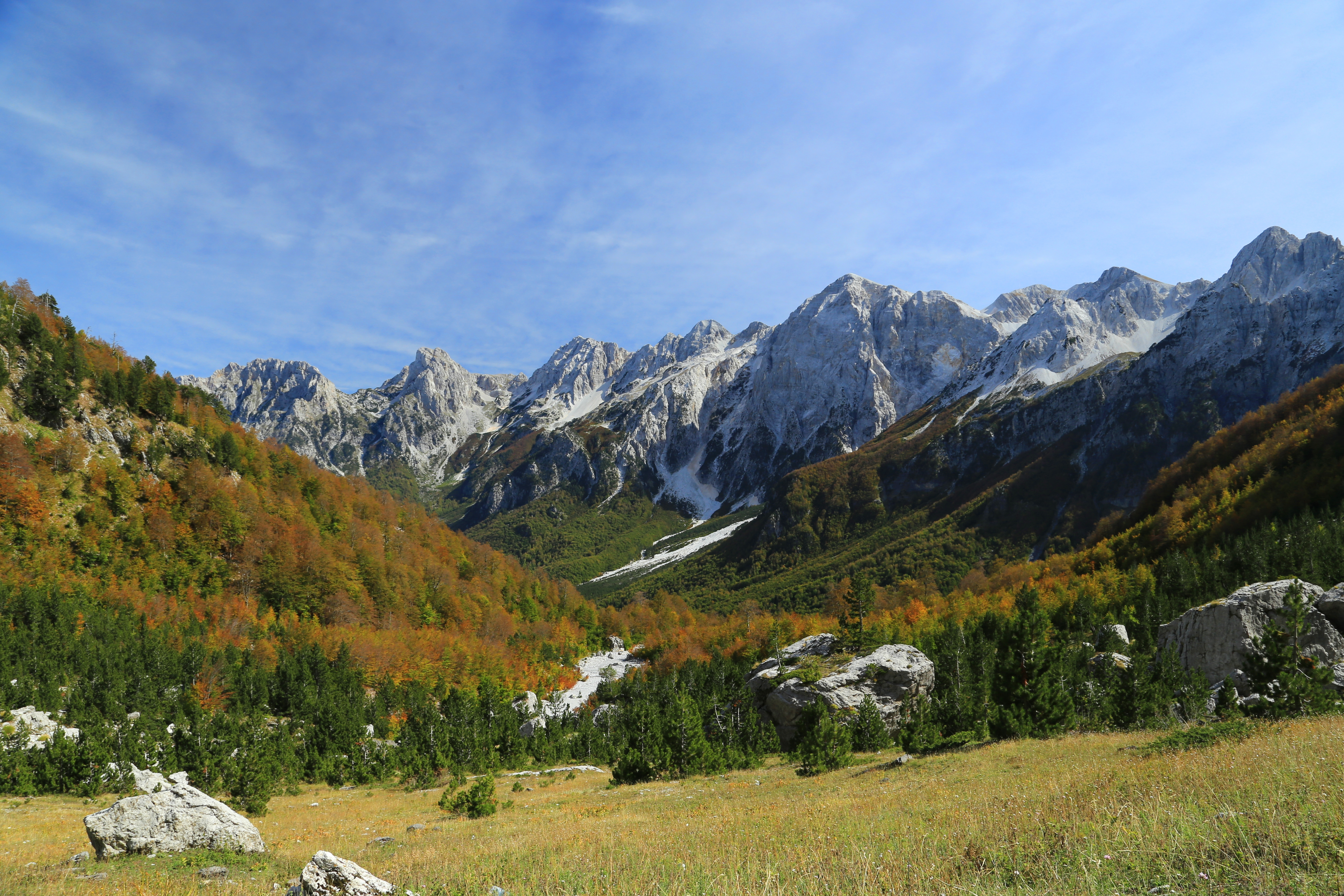
Valbonë Valley National Park
15 January 1996

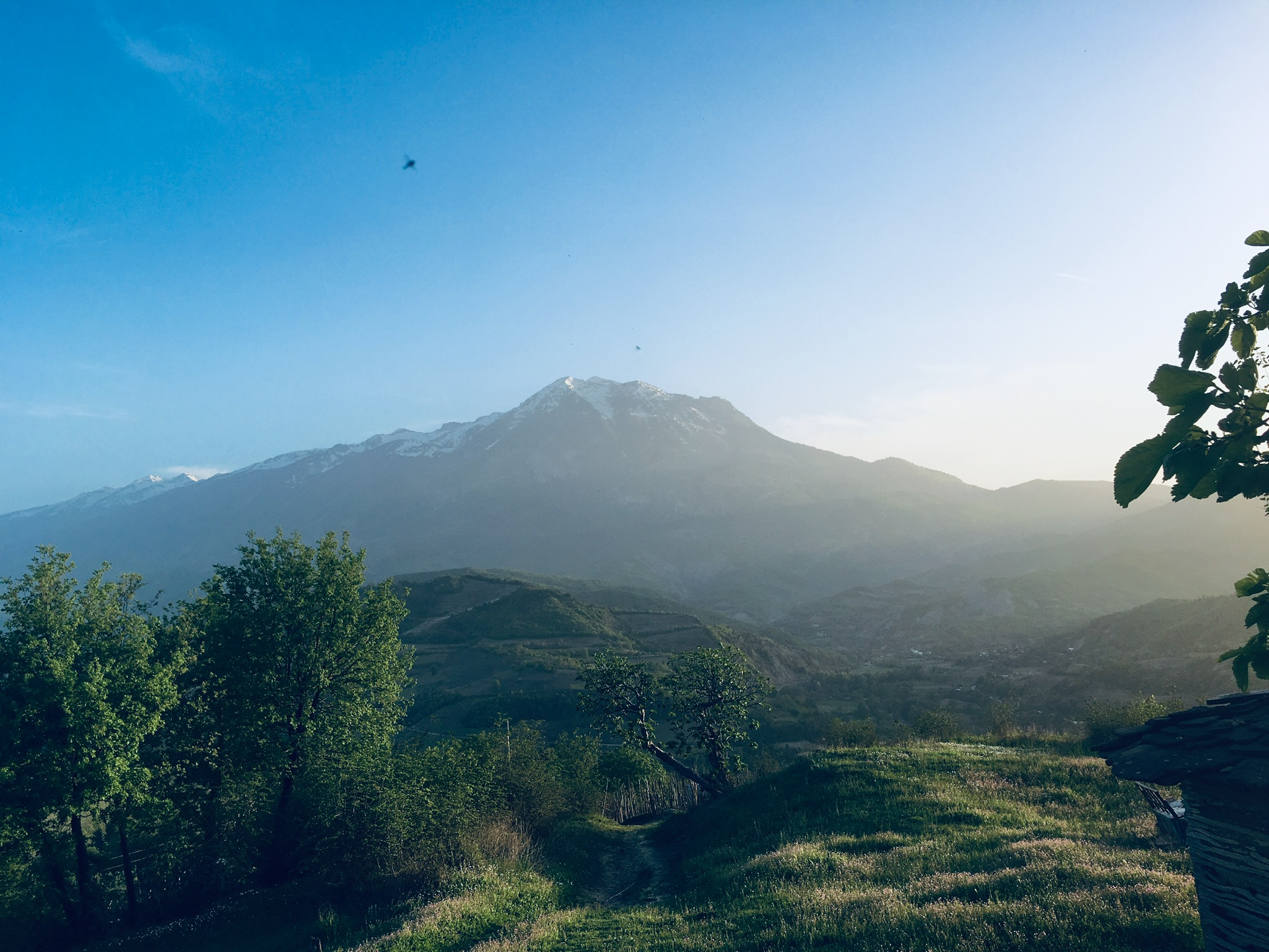
Tomorr National Park
18 July 2012

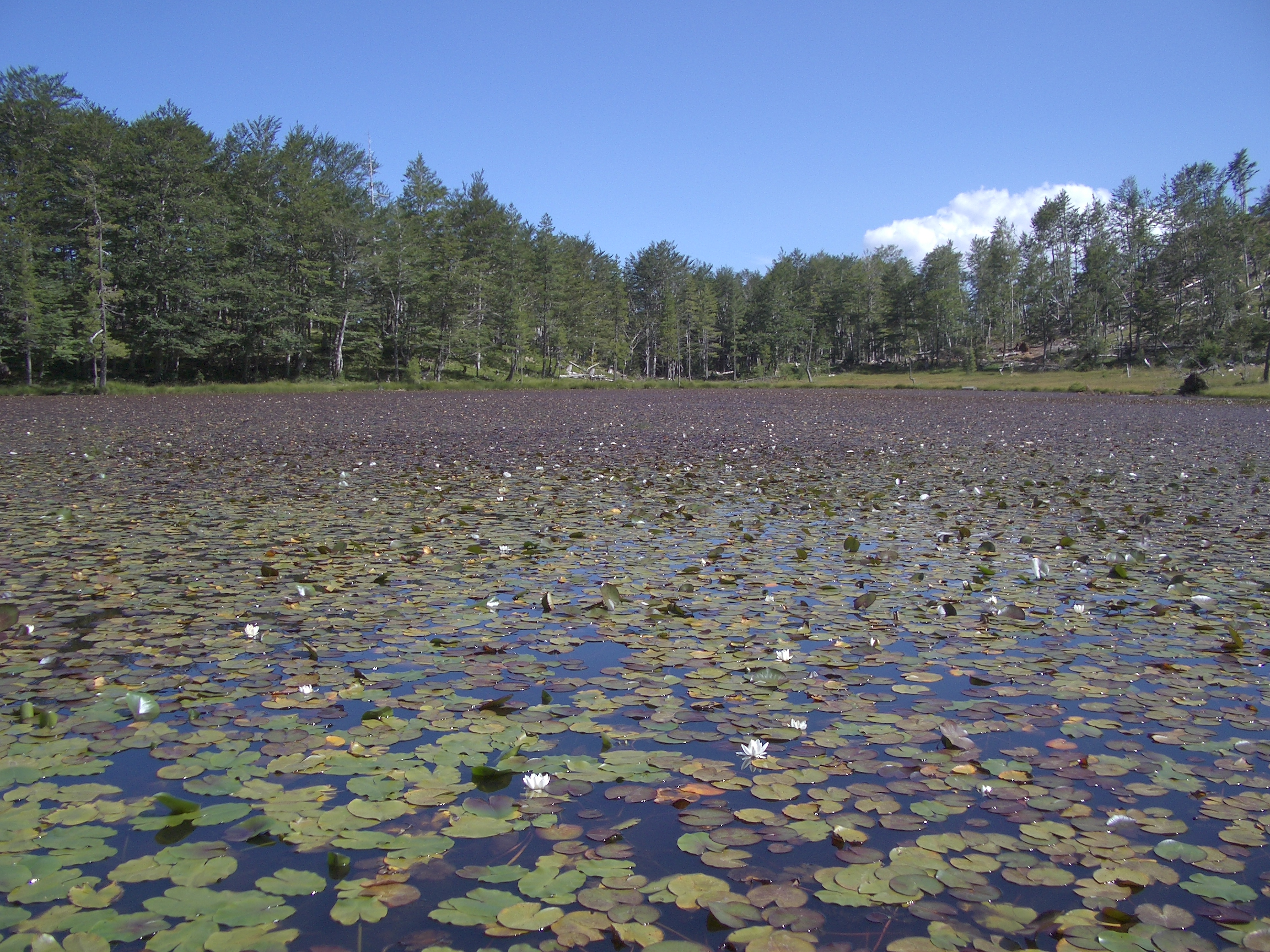
Lurë National Park
31 October 2018

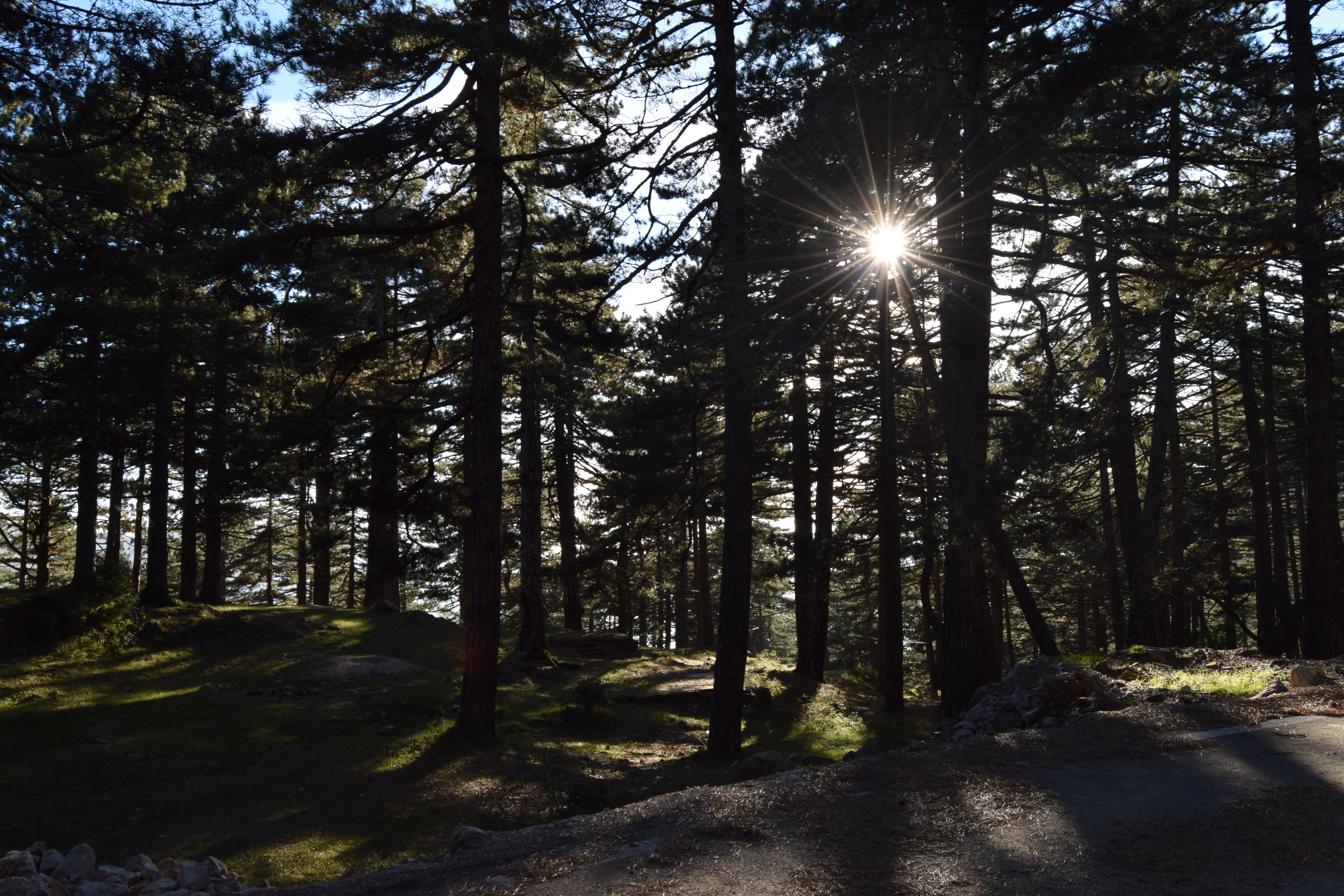
Shtamë Pass National Park
15 January 1996

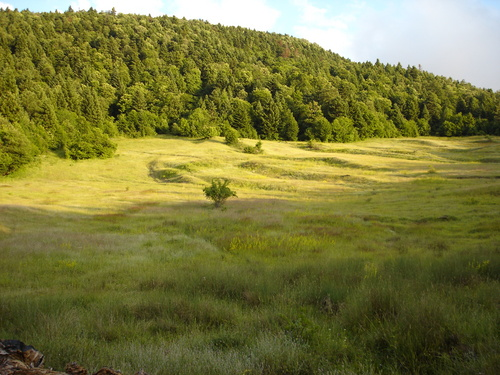
Fir of Hotovë-Dangelli National Park
17 December 2008

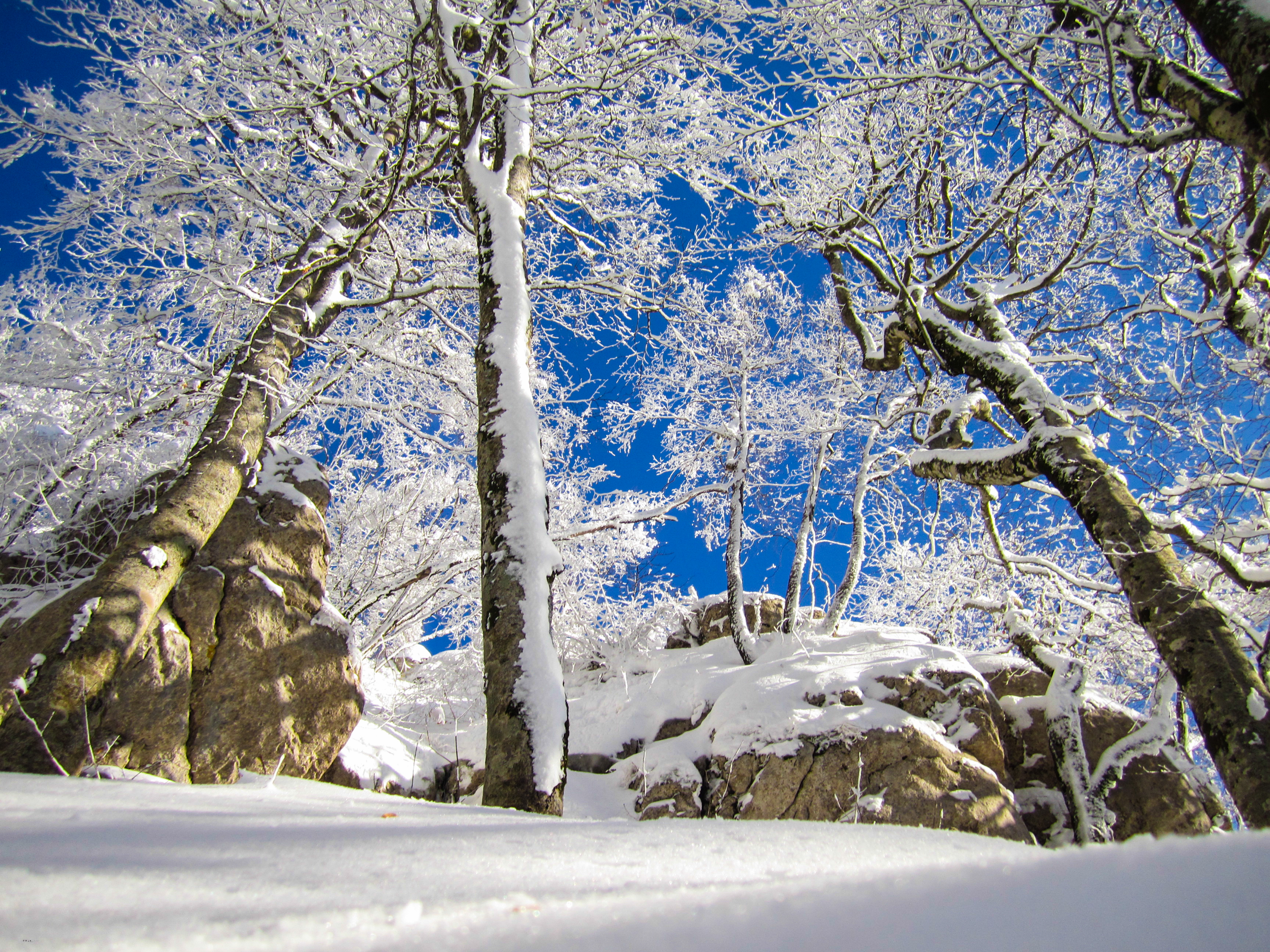
Dajti National Park
16 December 1960

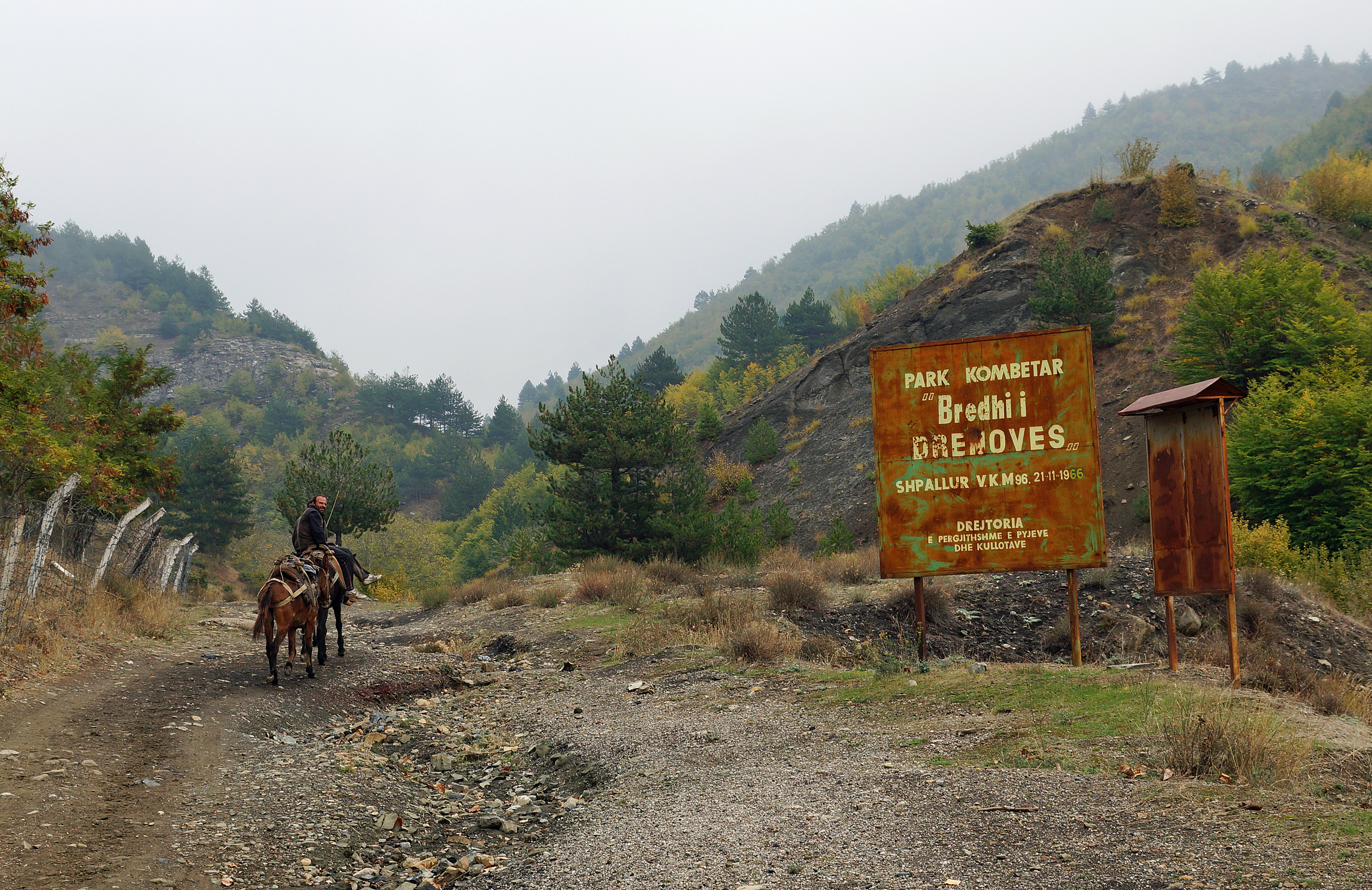
Fir of Drenovë National Park
21 November 1966

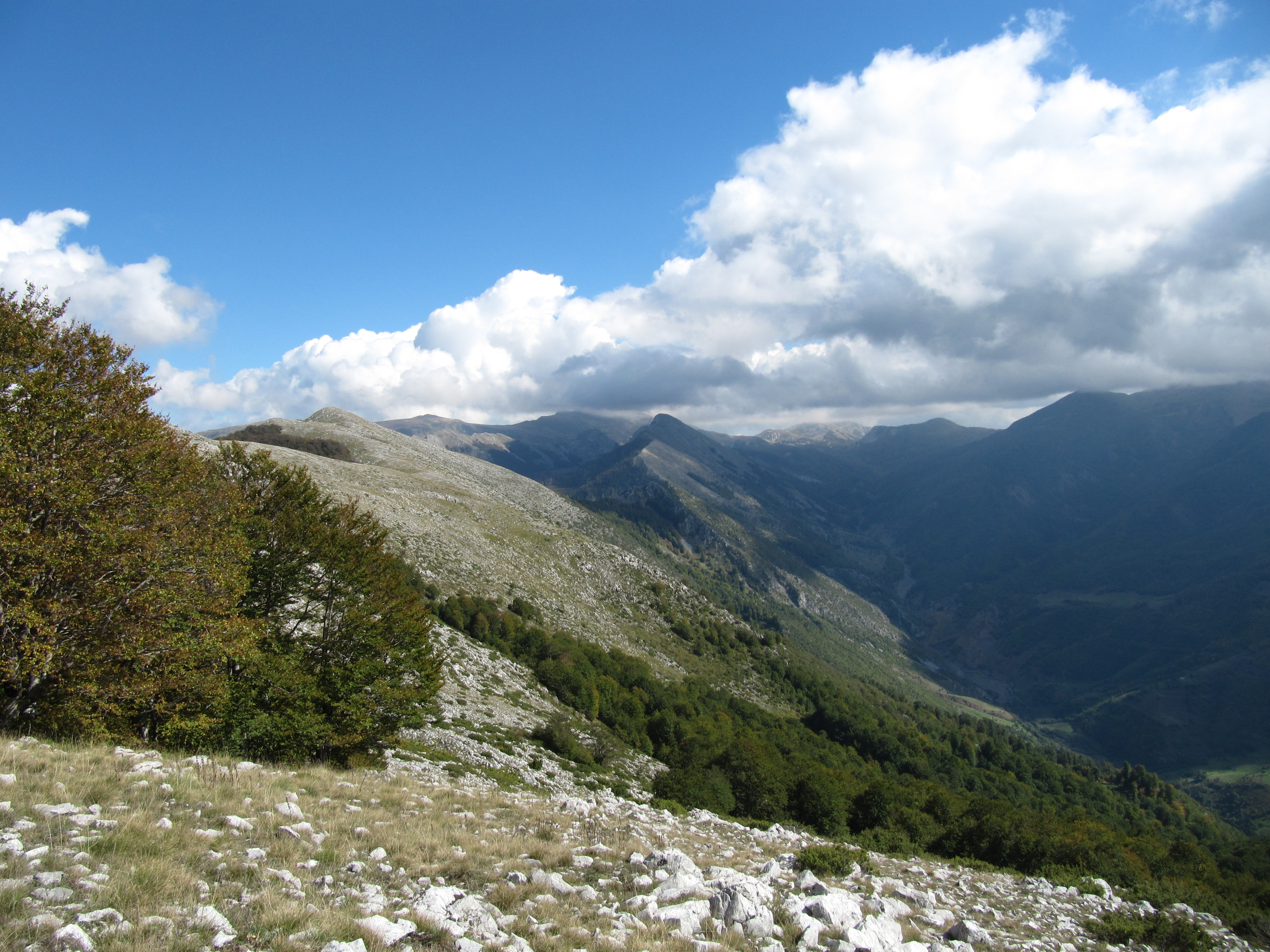
Shebenik-Jabllanicë National Park
21 May 2008

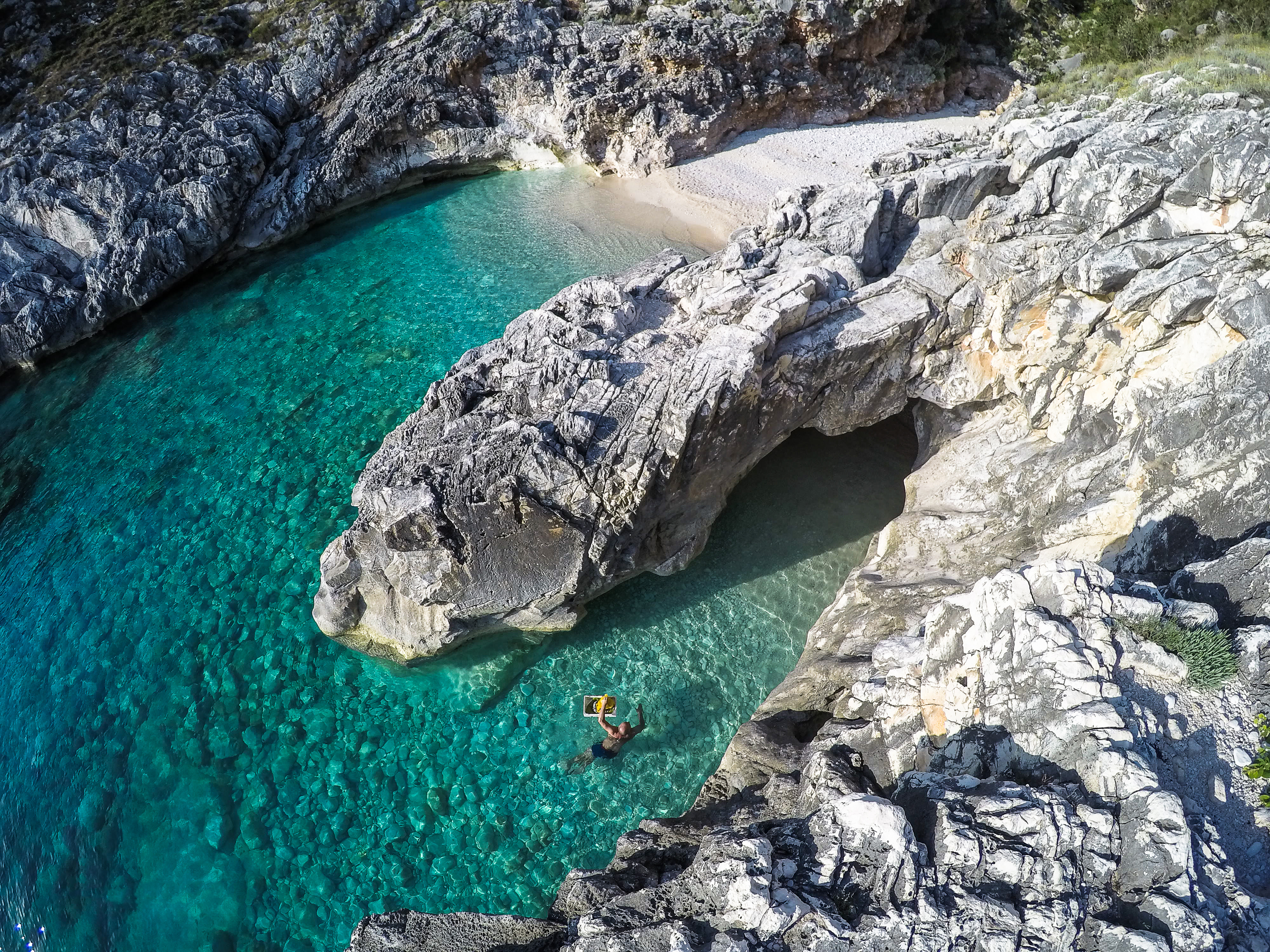
Karaburun-Sazan Marine Park
28 April 2010

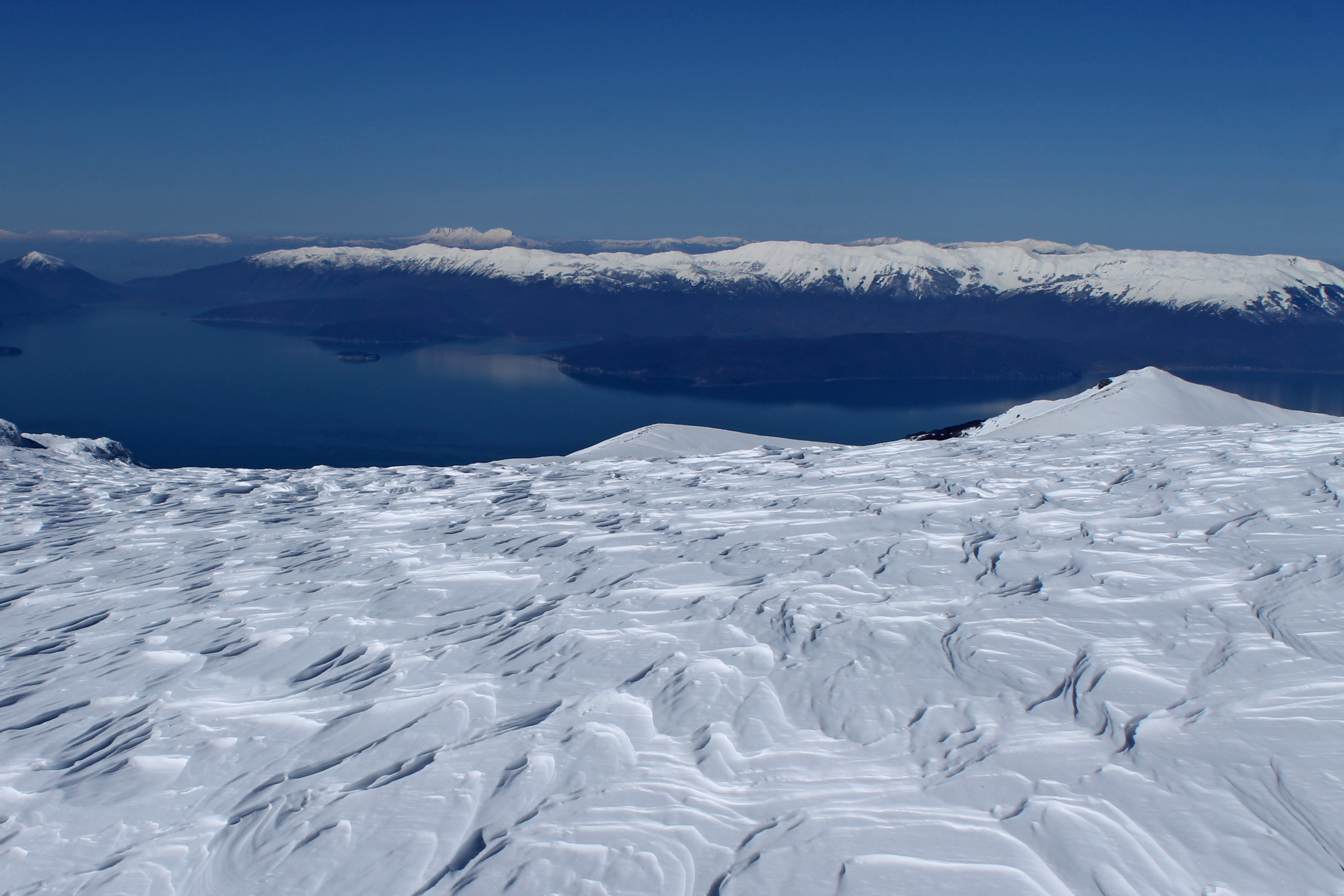
Prespa National Park
18 February 1999

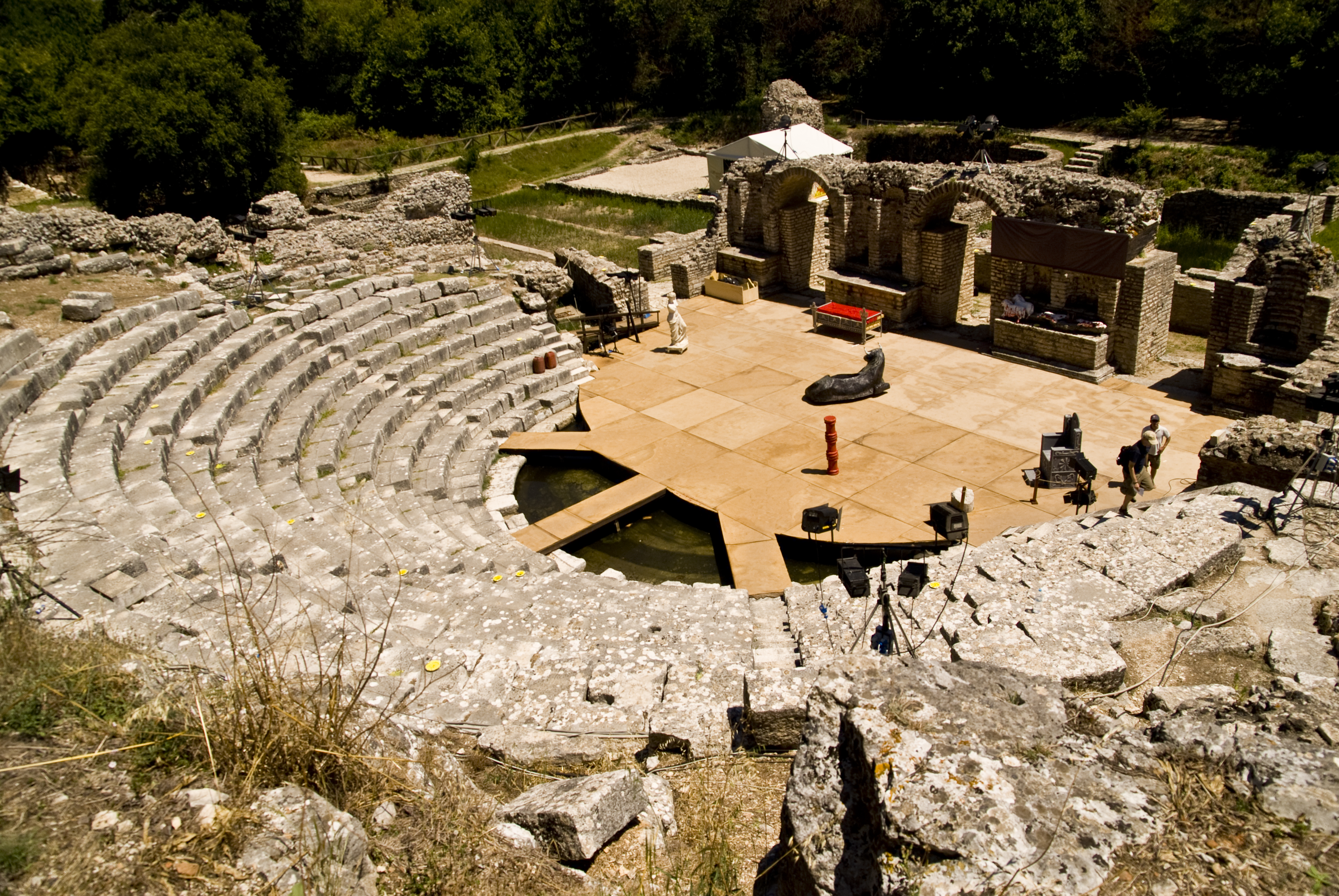
Butrint National Park
2 March 2000

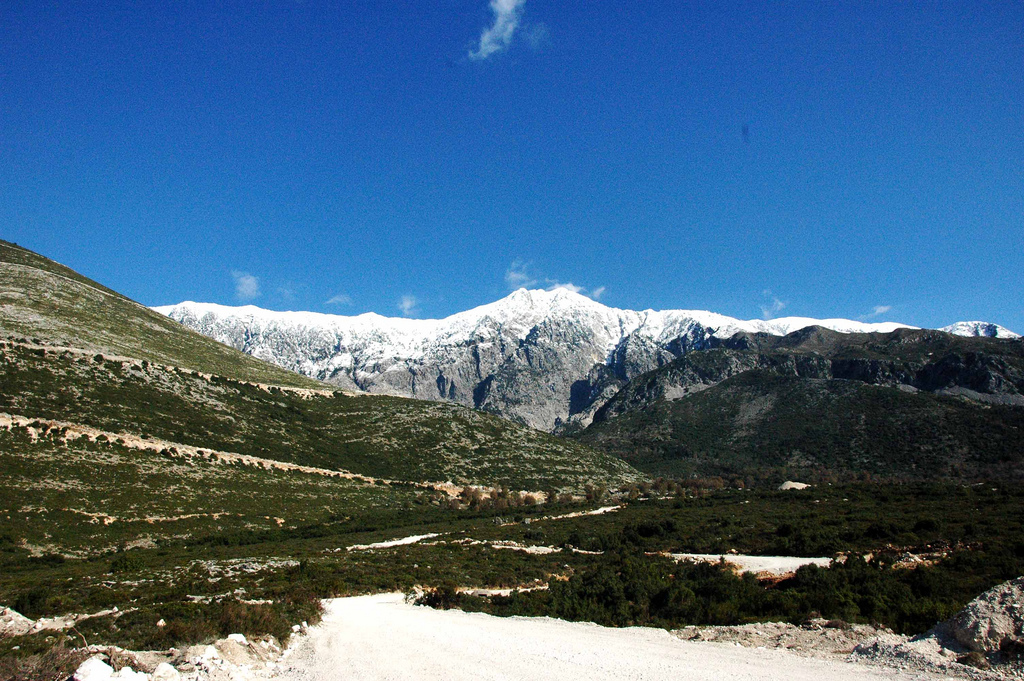
Llogara National Park
21 November 1966

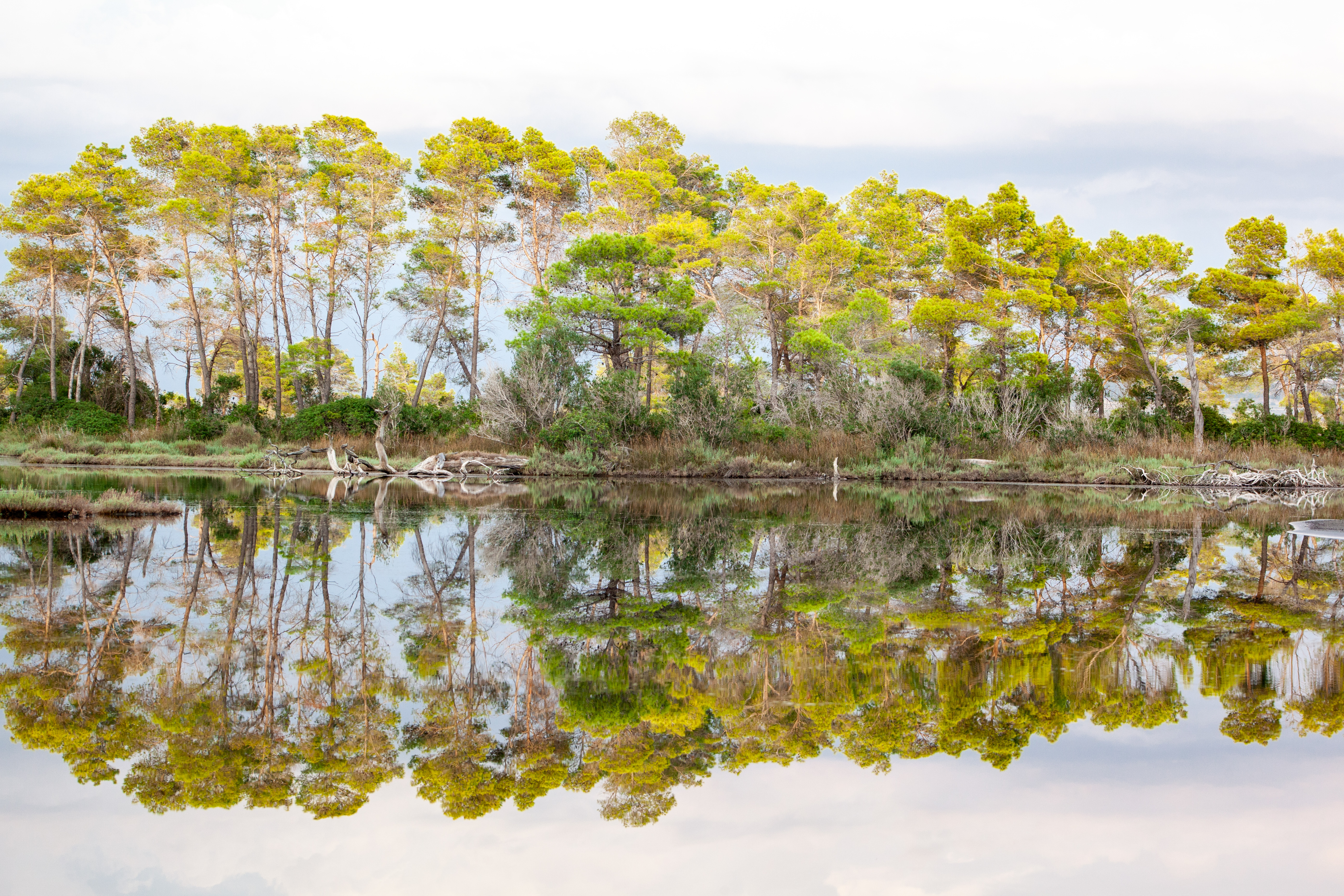
Divjakë-Karavasta National Park
19 October 2007
