= List of political scandals in Albania =

This is a list of major political controversies in Albania:

Controversy "name"	Date	People involved
Voting fraud	1992	Ramiz Alia's and his socialist party fraud
Civil war	1997	Actions leading to the downfall of Sali Berisha's government
Coup d'état	1998	Sali Berisha, Fatos Nano, Azem Hajdari
Fatmir Mediu affair	2008 March 15	Army scandal by minister Fatmir Mediu
