= Lëvizja Zgjohu =

Albanian think tank

- Type: Civilian Organisation
- Purpose: for denouncing political scandals
- Headquarters: Tirana, Albania
- Region served: Albania
- Official language: Albanian
- Leader: Zirkon Disha

Lëvizja Zgjohu is an Albanian NGO denouncing political points in mainly Albania.

The former Socialist opposition doubted the political independence of this organization because they claimed that the funding sources of its campaigns were unclear, and the clear one-sided campaign against Edi Rama.

The organisation is led by Zirkon Disha, accused by the Socialist Party of Albania of having a connection with the Democratic Party of Albania. A court concluded that this was not true.
