= Albania and weapons of mass destruction =

Albania once possessed a stockpile of weapons of mass destruction. This stockpile of chemical weapons included 16,678 kilograms (36,769 lb) of mustard gas, lewisite, adamsite, and phenacyl chloride (chloroacetophenone).

Albania was among the initial countries who signed the Chemical Weapons Convention (CWC) in 1993. The treaty, which came into force in 1997, requires the declaration of chemical stockpiles, and the destruction of all chemical weapons, delivery systems and production facilities. One of only six nations to declare a stockpile, Albania made its declaration in March 2003, after the discovery, in December 2002, of 600 bulk containers of chemicals in an abandoned bunker. The material was probably acquired by Communist leader Enver Hoxha in the mid-1970s from China although no documentation was found, therefore this is entirely speculative.

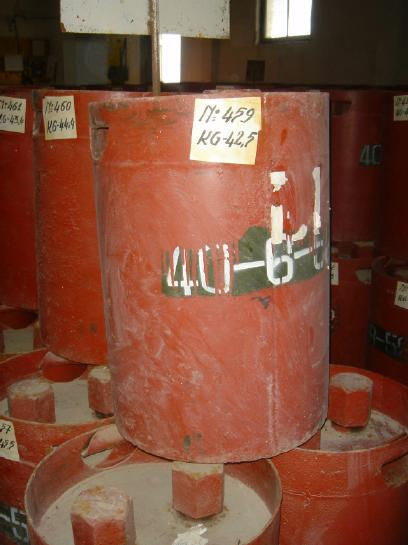
Albanian chemical weapons.

On 11 July 2007, the Organisation for the Prohibition of Chemical Weapons (OPCW) confirmed the destruction of the entire chemical weapons stockpile in Albania, making Albania the first nation to completely destroy all of its chemical weapons under the terms of the CWC. Costs were approximately 48 million U.S. dollars. The United States assisted with and funded the destruction operations under the Nunn-Lugar Cooperative Threat Reduction.

== Biological and nuclear weapons ==
=== Acquisition of the atomic bomb from the Sigurimi ===
In the early 1960s, the Albanian intelligence services (Sigurimi), allegedly under the leadership of Kadri Hazbiu, engaged in clandestine activities. Reports suggest that during this period, there was an attempt to acquire sensitive military information, including the potential procurement of a secret atomic bomb. According to historical accounts, Dhimiter Gjoni, the resident operative in Italy, played a pivotal role as an intelligence representative for the Albanian authorities. Gjoni conveyed information indicating that through an agent codenamed 'Rampa,' efforts were made to obtain advanced military technology, including a remotely controlled anti-tank shell named 'Cobra'.

During these activities, 'Rampa' purportedly proposed a transaction, demanding a fee of $2000 for the acquisition of the anti-tank technology. Later, the head of Albanian intelligence, Dhimiter Gjoni based in Rome, reportedly shared information suggesting that 'Rampa' claimed to have the potential to obtain classified details regarding the atomic bomb. The price for this escalated to $6000, with 'Rampa' asserting a connection to an individual with access to such information at the Atomic Center of France."

Albania acceded to the Biological Weapons Convention on June 3, 1992, banning biological weapons. It also acceded to the Nuclear Non-Proliferation Treaty in September 1990. Albania joined the Geneva Protocol on 20 December 1989, banning chemical and biological weapons and deposited its accession to the Comprehensive Nuclear-Test-Ban Treaty on 23 April 2003.

== See also ==
- Cold War
