= Freedom of religion in Albania =

The Constitution of Albania provides for freedom of religion, and the Government has generally respected this right in practice. There have been no reports of societal abuses or discrimination based on religious beliefs or practice.

In data collected by sociologists Brian Grim and Roger Finke in 2006, Albania scored low on Government Regulation of Religion, Social Regulation of Religion, Government Favoritism of Religion and Religious Persecution.

In 2022, Freedom House rated Albania 4 out of 4 for religious freedom.

== Demographics ==
According to Boston University's 2020 World Religion Database, Albania's religious affiliation is 59% Muslim, 38% Christian, 2.5% atheist or agnostic, and 0.6% Baháʼí.

== Legal and policy framework ==
The Constitution provides for freedom of religion, and the Government declares that it generally respect this right. The Government declares its secularism. There is no official religion and all religions are equal; however, the predominant religious communities (Sunni Muslim, Bektashi, Orthodox, and Catholic) enjoy a greater degree of official recognition (e.g., national holidays) and social status based on their historical presence in the country. Official holidays include holy days from all four predominant faiths.

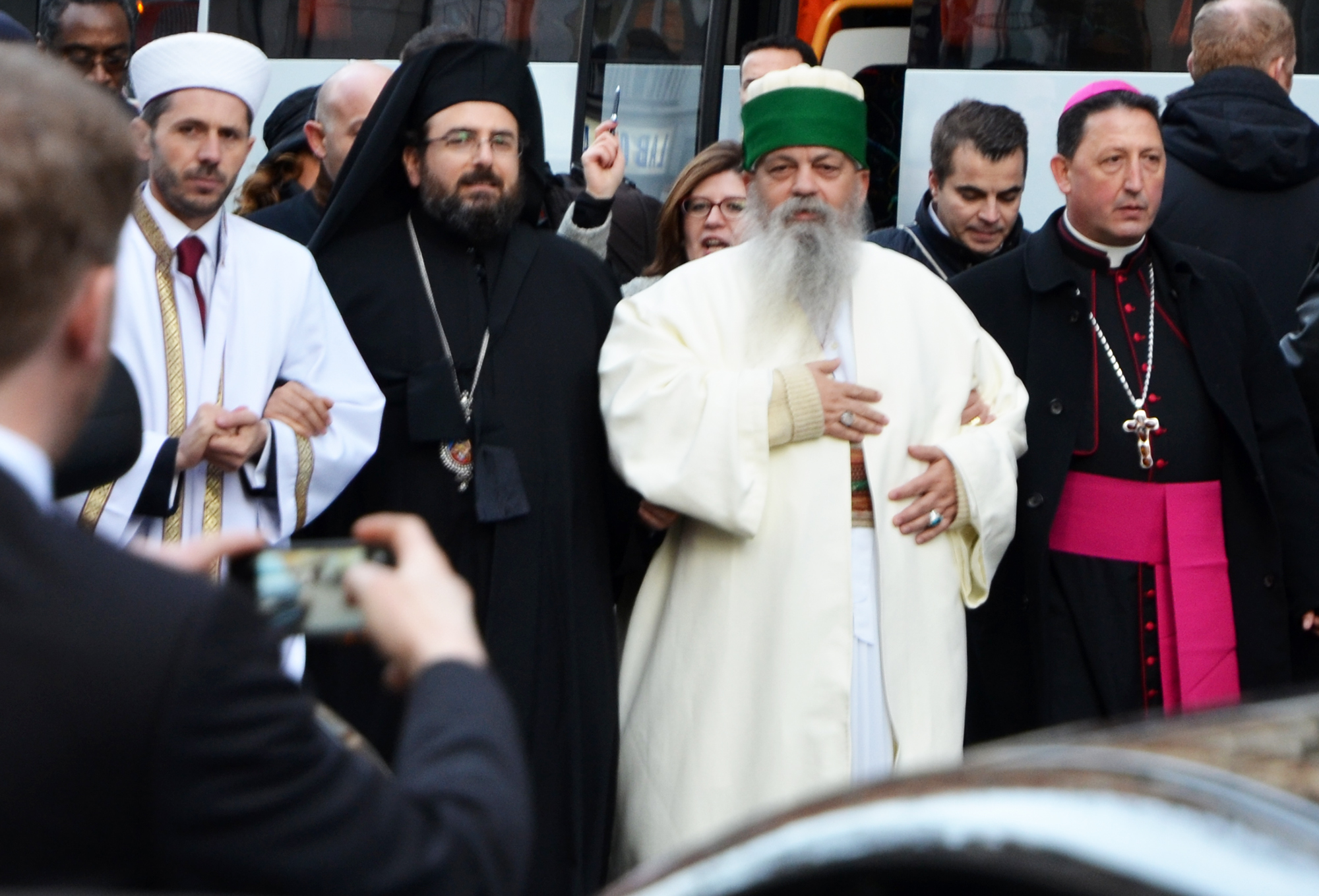
Leaders of Albania's four main denominations in Paris, France after the Charlie Hebdo attacks, 2015

All registered religious groups have the right to hold bank accounts and to own property and buildings. No restriction is imposed on families regarding the way they raise their children with respect to religious practices. The generally amicable relationship among religions in society contributed to religious freedom.

=== Licensing ===
The Government doesn't require registration or licensing of religious groups; however, the State Committee on Cults maintains records and statistics on foreign religious organizations that contact it for assistance. No groups reported difficulties registering during the period covered by this report. All registered religious groups have the right to hold bank accounts and own property. Religious movements may acquire the official status of a juridical person by registering with the Tirana District Court under the Law on Nonprofit Organizations, which recognizes the status of a nonprofit association regardless of whether the organization has a cultural, recreational, religious, or humanitarian character. All religious communities have criticized the Government for its unwillingness to grant them tax-exempt status. Since 2003 foreign religious missionaries have been exempt from the residence permit tax.

The State Committee on Cults, under the jurisdiction of the Ministry of Tourism, Culture, Youth, and Sports, is charged with regulating relations between the Government and all religious communities as well as protecting freedom of religion and promoting interreligious cooperation and understanding. The committee claims that its records on religious organizations facilitate the granting of residence permits by police to foreign employees of various religious organizations. No organization claimed any difficulty in obtaining residency permits during the period covered by this report. However, as a general rule, foreign religious missionaries were issued only 1-year residency permits instead of the 5-year permits allowed by law for residents in the country more than 2 years. During the period covered by this report, the committee began working with the Government on criteria that would allow longer-term residency permits of up to 5 years for well-established religious organizations with long-term ties to the country.

There is no law or regulation forcing religious organizations to notify the Committee of their activities; however, article 10 of the Constitution calls for separate bilateral agreements to regulate relations between the Government and religious communities. The Catholic Church continued to be the only religious community that had finalized such an agreement with the Government. The committee had a mandate to negotiate agreements with the three remaining groups and created a working group in May 2006 for this purpose. The Committee reportedly reached an agreement with three groups—the Muslim, Orthodox, and Muslim Bektashi communities. VUSH, a Protestant umbrella organization, approached the committee to negotiate a bilateral agreement but had not received a response by the end of the reporting period.

=== Religious Schools ===
The Ministry of Education states that public schools in the country are secular and that the law prohibits ideological and religious indoctrination. According to official figures, religious communities, organizations, and foundations managed 101 educational institutions, of which 15 were officially religious-affiliated schools, with more than 2,600 students. By law the Ministry of Education must license such schools, and curricula must comply with national education standards. The Catholic and Muslim groups operated numerous state-licensed schools and reported no problems in obtaining new licenses for new schools. The Orthodox Church and the Bektashis operated strictly religious educational centers for the training of clerics.

== Religious property claims ==
During the communist era, properties confiscated by the regime generally were recorded, and the Government was working to recognize these archival documents as equivalent to property titles, thus clarifying land ownership in some cases. Government policy and practice contributed to the generally free practice of religion; however, restitution of property expropriated by the former communist government continued to be a problem in the early 21st century. According to the law on the restitution of and compensation for such properties, religious communities have the same rights as private individuals in matters of property restitution or compensation, but the religious communities questioned the law's limitation on property restitution to 150 acres (0.61 km^{2}).

In 2006, all four major traditional communities had substantial property claims that remained unresolved. In cases involving the return of religious buildings, the Government often failed to return the land surrounding the buildings, sometimes because of redevelopment claims by private individuals who began farming it or using it for other purposes. The Catholic Church had substantial outstanding property claims in 2006. The Albanian Islamic Community and the Muslim Bektashis also requested that the Government return a number of properties.

In the 2020s, the government continued the process of legalizing buildings constructed by religious groups - primarily Sunni mosques, Catholic, Albanian Autocephalous Orthodox churches, and Bektashi tekkes (centers of worship) built without government approval in the early 1990s. The SAC reported that it legalized 104 such buildings in 2021, and 97 in 2022.

== Societal abuses and discrimination ==
Generally, Albania has very little religious strife. However, in the early 21st century, there were some incidents of mistreatment as a result of religious beliefs.

The Orthodox Church's 1954 statute states that its archbishop must have Albanian citizenship.

Since 2001 a number of Albanian Muslims have been harassed, discriminated and persecuted because of their religious beliefs. The Security Services of Albania have detained an Albanian imam, Artan Kristo, without any proven conviction. According to Artan Kristo's statements and the statements of a number of Albanian imams and the Muslim Forum of Albania, Kristo is illegally detained, since he did not agree to become a spy for the Albanian Security Services.

While there is no law restricting the demonstration of religious affiliation in public schools, there have been instances when students were not allowed to do so in practice.

In 2002, some Bektashi communities outside of Tirana experienced intimidation, vandalism, and threats of violence. Subsequently, the Albanian authorities identified those responsible (non-Albanian citizens) and expelled them for immigration laws violations. There were no new reports of vandalism during the period covered by this report. Bektashi leaders believe that foreign religious influences seeking to undermine the country's efforts to maintain religious tolerance and freedom were at the root of these incidents. Other religious leaders have expressed similar concerns about the potentially divisive role played by foreign religious extremists.

The General Secretary of the Islamic Community of Albania, Sali Tivari, was shot and killed at the Community's headquarters in January 2003. The General Prosecutor's Office returned the case to the authorities for further investigation and it has remained unsolved by the end of the period covered by this report.

In October 2003, police arrested Kastriot Myftari, author of the book "Albanian National Islamism" on charges of inciting religious hatred against Islam. The book contained the author's opinions on Islam and how the religion has impacted upon Albanian life. According to the prosecutor's office, several statements in the book demeaned Islam. The prosecutor had asked the court for 6 months imprisonment for the author. In June, the court acquitted Myftari of all charges.

During year 2004, representatives of the Eastern Orthodox Church expressed concerns that churches, crosses, and other buildings were targets of vandalism.

In November 2005 a speech from Albania's president in London, aroused public protests from The Muslim Forum of Albania that accused the president of insulting Islam.

In April 2008, a novel from the Socialist MP, Ben Blushi was condemned by a number of Muslim NGO's as racist and Islamophobic. According to the NGO's the author shows signs of racism against the Turks, Romani people and Albanian Muslims in the novel, and portrays Muhammed in a very disrespectful way.

== See also ==
- Religion in Albania
- Human rights in Albania
