= Google Arts & Culture =

Online platform exploring partner museums

- Screenshot of the website, showing different themes
- Developer: Google
- Release: February 1, 2011; 15 years ago

Stable release(s) [±]
- Android: 11.9.1246 (Build 1003043152) / October 21, 2026; 17 days ago
- iOS (Note: Including iPadOS): 11.17.1 / October 22, 2026; 16 days ago
- Google Chrome: 3.1 / March 10, 2026; 7 months ago
- Operating system: Android 8+; iOS 17+; web; Discontinued: Android 5, 6, 7, iOS 16 (2025); iOS 15 (2023); iOS 14 (2022); iOS 13 (2021); iOS 10, 11, 12 (2020); Android KitKat (2018)
- Website: artsandculture.google.com

Google Arts & Culture (formerly Google Art Project) is an online platform of high-resolution images and videos of artworks and cultural artifacts from partner cultural organizations throughout the world, operated by Google.

It utilizes high-resolution image technology that enables the viewer to tour partner organization collections and galleries and explore the artworks' physical and contextual information. The platform includes advanced search capabilities and educational tools.

== Features (first version) ==
=== Virtual Gallery Tour ===
Through the Virtual Gallery Tour (also known as Gallery View) users can virtually 'walk through' the galleries of each partner cultural organization, using the same controls as Google Street View or by clicking on the gallery's floorplan.

=== Artwork View ===
From the Gallery View (also known as Microscope View), users can zoom in on a particular artwork to view the picture in greater detail. As of April 2012, over 32,000 high-quality images were available. The Microscope view provides a dynamic image of an artwork and scholarly and contextual information to enhance their understanding of the work. When examining an artwork, users could also access information on the item's physical characteristics (e.g. size, material(s), artist). Additional options were Viewing Notes, History of the Artwork, and Artist Information, which users can easily access from the microscope view interface. Each cultural organization was allowed to include as much material as they wanted to contribute, so the level of information varied.

=== Create an Artwork Collection ===
Users can compile any number of images from the partner organizations and save specific views of artworks to create a personalized virtual exhibition. Using Google's link abbreviator (Goo.gl), users could share their artwork collection with others through social media and conventional online communication mechanisms. This feature was so successful upon the platform's launch that Google had to dedicate additional servers to support it.

== Features (second version) ==
=== Explore and Discover ===
In the second launch of the platform, Google updated the platform's search capabilities so that users could more easily and intuitively find artworks. Users could find art by filtering their search with several categories, including artist, museum, type of work, date and country. The search results were displayed in a slideshow format. This new function enabled site users to more easily search across numerous collections.

=== Video and Audio Content ===
Several partner cultural organizations opted to include guided tours or welcome videos of their galleries. This provided users the option to virtually walk through a museum and listen to an audio guide for certain artworks, or to follow a video tour that guided them through a gallery. For example, Michelle Obama filmed a welcome video for the White House gallery page, and Israel's Holocaust Museum Yad Vashem launched a YouTube channel with 400 hours of original video footage from the trial of Adolf Eichmann which users could access through the museum's Arts & Culture exhibits. There is a project created by David Li featuring a bird playing cello. Users can control the bird's cello bow with their computer mouse. Several classical compositions are available to play in sync with visual cues and accompaniment strings.

=== Education ===
Google Arts & Culture includes several educational tools and resources for teachers and students, such as educational videos, art history timelines, art toolkits, and comparative teaching resources. Two features, called "Look Like an Expert" and "DIY", provide activities similar to those often found in art galleries. For example, one quiz asks site visitors to match a painting to a particular style; another asks visitors to find a symbol within a specified painting that represents a provided story.

=== Art Selfie ===
Google Arts & Culture allows people to find their fine art likeness by snapping a selfie. The app matches the user's face to old art museum portraits from Google's database. The app topped the download charts in January 2018. The feature was initially created by Cyril Diagne.

== Development ==
Video showing the technology and processes used to capture images of the White House for the Google Arts & Culture

The platform emerged as a result of Google's "20-percent time" policy, by which employees were encouraged to spend 20% of their time working on an innovative project of interest. A small team of employees created the concept for the platform after a discussion on how to use the firm's technology to make museum' artwork more accessible. The platform concept fit the firm's mission "to organize the world's information and make it universally accessible and useful." Accordingly, in mid-2009, Google executives agreed to support the project, and they engaged online curators of numerous museums to commit to the initiative.

The platform was launched on February 1, 2011, by the Google Cultural Institute with contributions from international museums, including the Tate Gallery, London, the Metropolitan Museum of Art. New York City; and the Uffizi, Florence. On April 3, 2012, Google announced a major expansion, with more than 34,000 artworks from 151 museums and arts organizations from 40 countries, including the Art Gallery of Ontario, the White House, the Australian Rock Art Gallery at Griffith University, the Museum of Islamic Art, Doha, and the Hong Kong Museum of Art.

=== Technology used ===
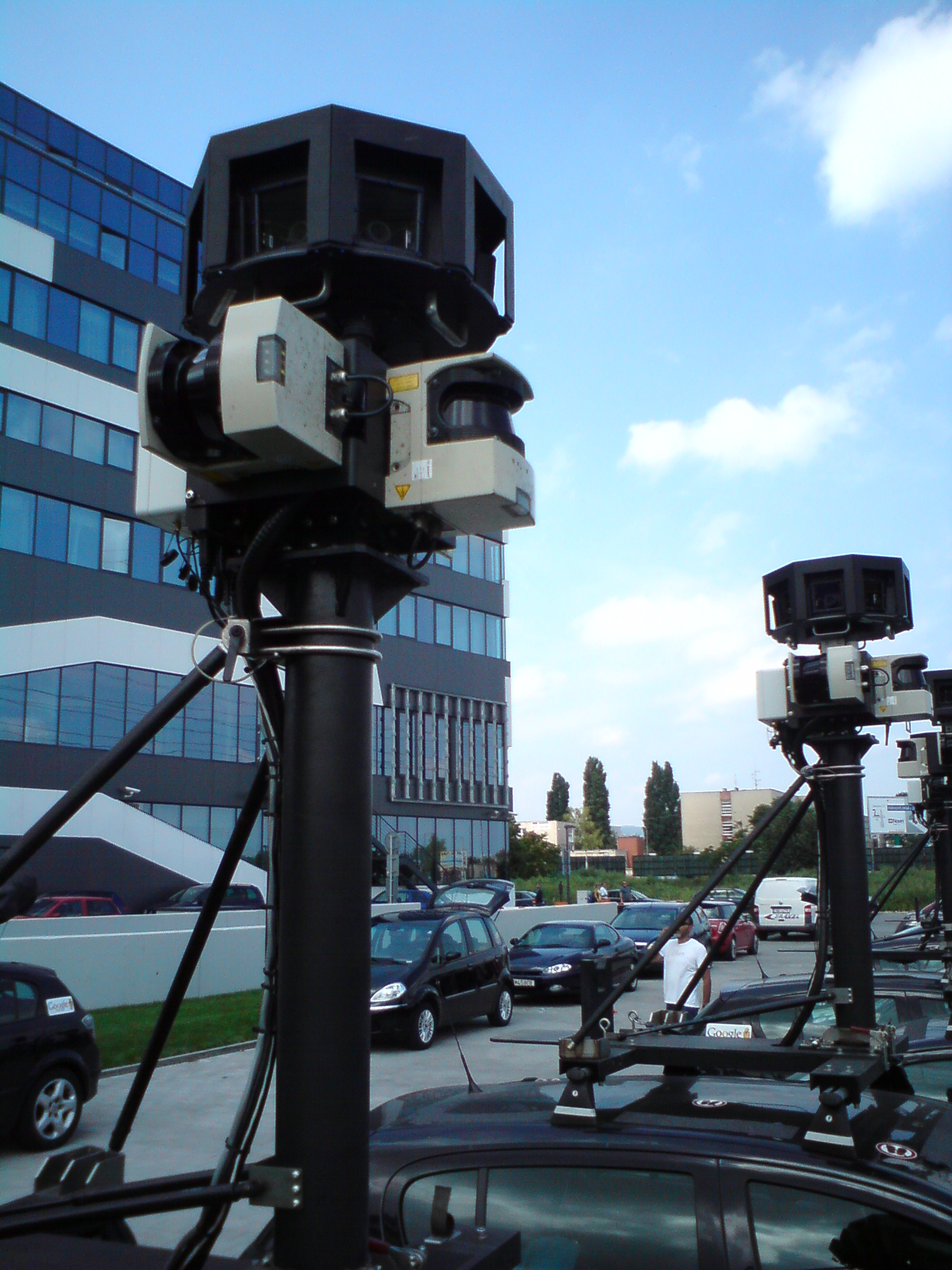
The Google Street View Camera captures 360 degree images as it moves through the location. Usually, the camera sits atop a car to capture Street View images, but the platform camera was installed on an indoor trolley.

The team leveraged existing technologies, including Google Street View and Picasa, and built new tools specifically for the platform.

They created an indoor-version of the camera system to capture gallery images by pushing the camera 'trolley' through a museum. It also used professional panoramic heads Clauss RODEON VR Head Hd And Clauss VR Head ST to take high-resolution photos of the artworks within a gallery. This technology allowed excellent attention to detail and the highest image resolution. Each partner museum selected one artwork to be captured at ultra-high resolution with approximately 1,000 times more detail than the average digital camera. The largest image, Alexander Andreyevich Ivanov's The Apparition of Christ to the People, is over 12 gigapixels. To maximize image quality, the team coordinated with partner museums' lighting technicians and photography teams. For example, at Tate Britain, they collaborated to capture a gigapixel image of No Woman No Cry in both natural light and in the dark. Tate suggested this method to capture the painting's hidden phosphorescent image, which glows in the dark. The Google camera team had to adapt their method and keep the camera shutter open for 8 seconds in the dark to capture a distinct enough image. Now, unlike at Tate, from the site, one can view the painting in both light settings.

Once the images were captured, the team used Google Street View software and GPS data to seamlessly stitch the images and connect them to museum floor plans. Each image was mapped according to longitude and latitude, so that users can seamlessly transition to it from Google Maps, looking inside the partner museums' galleries. Street View was also integrated with Picasa, for a seamless transition from gallery view to microscope view.

The user interface lets site visitors virtually 'walk through' galleries with Google Street View, and look at artworks with Picasa, which provides the microscope view to zoom in to images for greater detail than is visible to the naked eye. Additionally, the microscope view of artworks incorporates other resources—including Google Scholar, Google Docs and YouTube—so users can link to external content to learn more about the work. Finally, the platform incorporates Google's URL compacter (Goo.gl), so that users can save and easily share their personal collections.

The resulting platform is a Java-based Google App Engine Web application, which exists on Google's infrastructure.

=== Technology limitations ===
Hans Holbein the Younger's The Ambassadors

Luc Vincent, director of engineering at Google and head of the team responsible for Street View for the platform, expressed concern over the quality of panorama cameras his team used to capture gallery and artwork images. In particular, he believes that improved aperture control would enable more consistent quality of gallery images.

Some artworks were particularly difficult to capture and re-present accurately as virtual, two-dimensional images. For example, Google described the inclusion of Hans Holbein the Younger's The Ambassadors as "tough". This was due to the anamorphic techniques distorting the image of a skull in the foreground of the painting. When looking at the original painting at the National Gallery in London, the depiction of the skull appears distorted until the viewer physically steps to the side of the painting. Once the viewer is looking at the shape from the intended vantage point, the lifelike depiction of the skull materializes. The effect is still apparent in the gigapixel version of the painting but was less pronounced in the "walk-through" function.

As New York Times art reviewer Roberta Smith said: "[Google Arts & Culture] is very much a work in progress, full of bugs and information gaps, and sometimes blurry, careering virtual tours." Though the second-generation platform solved some technological issues, the firm plans to continue developing additional enhancements for the site. Future improvements currently under consideration include: upgrading panorama cameras, more detailed web metrics, and improved searchability through meta-tagging and user-generated meta-tagging. The firm is also considering the addition of an experimental page to the platform, to highlight emerging technologies that artists are using to showcase their works.

== Institutions and works ==
Seventeen partner museums were included in the launch of the project. The original 1,061 high-resolution images (by 486 different artists) are shown in 385 virtual gallery rooms, with 6,000 Street View–style panoramas.

=== List of the initial 17 partner museums ===
Below is a list of the original seventeen partner museums at the time of the platform's launch. All images shown are actual images from Google Arts & Culture:

Partner Museum	Gigapixel artwork	Title	Artist	Date
Alte Nationalgalerie; Berlin, Germany		In the Conservatory	Édouard Manet	1878–1879
Freer Gallery of Art, Smithsonian; Washington, DC, US		The Princess from the Land of Porcelain	James McNeill Whistler	1863–1865
Frick Collection; New York, US		St Francis in the Desert	Giovanni Bellini	c. 1480
Gemäldegalerie; Berlin, Germany		The Merchant Georg Gisze	Hans Holbein the Younger	1497–1562
Museum Kampa; Prague, Czech Republic		The Cathedral (Katedrála)	František Kupka	1912–1913
Metropolitan Museum of Art; New York, US		The Harvesters	Pieter Bruegel the Elder	1565
Museum of Modern Art; New York, US		The Starry Night	Vincent van Gogh	1889
Museo Reina Sofia; Madrid, Spain		The Bottle of Anís del Mono	Juan Gris	1914
Thyssen-Bornemisza Museum; Madrid, Spain		Young Knight in a Landscape	Vittore Carpaccio	1510
National Gallery; London, UK		The Ambassadors	Hans Holbein the Younger	1533
Palace of Versailles; Versailles, France		Marie-Antoinette de Lorraine-Habsbourg, Queen of France, and her children	Louise Élisabeth Vigée Le Brun	1787
Rijksmuseum Amsterdam; Amsterdam, Netherlands		Night Watch	Rembrandt Harmensz. van Rijn	1642
State Hermitage Museum; St. Petersburg, Russia		The Return of the Prodigal Son	Rembrandt Harmensz van Rijn	1663–1665
State Tretyakov Gallery; Moscow, Russia		The Appearance of Christ Before the People	Alexander Andreyevich Ivanov	1837–1857
Tate Britain; London, UK		No Woman No Cry	Chris Ofili	1998
Uffizi; Florence, Italy		The Birth of Venus	Sandro Botticelli	1483–1485
Capitoline Museums; Rome, Italy		Capitoline Wolf		500 BC–480 BC
Van Gogh Museum; Amsterdam, Netherlands		The Bedroom	Vincent van Gogh	1888

On April 3, 2012, Google announced the expansion of the platform to include 151 cultural organizations, with new partners contributing a gigapixel image of one of their works.

=== Partial list of Google Cultural Institute partners ===
The museum image redirects to the museum's official page on the Google Arts & Culture platform, the Google Street View logo indicates that the museum has an adapted version of Street View

Country / Territory	Museums
United States	National Building Museum; Smithsonian's National Air and Space Museum; Smithsonian National Museum of Natural History; Smithsonian's National Postal Museum; American Museum of Natural History; Intrepid Sea, Air & Space Museum; Metropolitan Museum of Art; Art Institute of Chicago @ Google Arts & Culture; NASA @ Google Arts & Culture; The J. Paul Getty Museum @ Google Arts & Culture; Museum of Fine Arts, Boston @ Google Arts & Culture; Philadelphia Museum of Art @ Google Arts & Culture; LIFE Photo Collection @ Google Arts & Culture; U.S. National Archives @ Google Arts & Culture; The Cloisters Museum and Gardens @ Google Arts & Culture; The Phillips Collection @ Google Arts & Culture; Los Angeles County Museum of Art @ Google Arts & Culture; The Frick Collection @ Google Arts & Culture; Minneapolis Institute of Art @ Google Arts & Culture; The Feminist Institute Digital Exhibit Project @ Google Arts & Culture
Canada	National Gallery of Canada; Royal Ontario Museum; Canada Aviation and Space Museum; Canada Agriculture and Food Museum; Royal Canadian Air Force (RCAF) Foundation
Mexico	National Museum of Art; National Museum of Anthropology; National Museum of Death
Peru	Lima Art Museum; Museum of Contemporary Art of Lima
Puerto Rico	Museum of Art of Puerto Rico; Museum of Art of Ponce
Colombia	Colombian National Museum; Museum of Contemporary Art of Bogotá; Gold Museum
Venezuela	Centro Cultural UCAB
Guatemala	Ixchel Museum of Indigenous Textiles and Clothing
Argentina	National Museum of Fine Arts of Argentina; Museum of Contemporary Art of Buenos Aires
Ecuador	Casa del Alabado Museum of Pre-Columbian Art
Chile	Andean University Museum of the Arts
Brazil	National Museum of Brazil; National Museum of Fine Arts

== Influences ==
The Google Art Project was a development of the virtual museum projects of the 1990s and 2000s, following the first appearance of online exhibitions with high-resolution images of artworks in 1995. In the late 1980s, art museum personnel began to consider how they could exploit the internet to achieve their institutions' missions through online platforms. For example, in 1994 Elizabeth Broun, Director of the Smithsonian American Art Museum, spoke to the Smithsonian Commission on the future of art, stating: "We need to put our institutional energy behind the idea of getting the Smithsonian hooked up to the people and schools of America." She then outlined the museum's objective to conserve, protect, present, and interpret exhibits, explaining how electronic media could help achieve these goals. The expansion of internet programs and resources has shaped the development of the platform.

== Copyright issues ==
Google Books affected the development of the platform from a non-technological perspective. Google faced a six-year-long court case relating to several issues with copyright infringement. Google Books cataloged full digital copies of texts, including those still protected by copyright, though Google claimed it was permissible under the fair use clause. Google ended up paying $125 million to copyright-holders of the protected books, though the settlement agreement was modified and debated several times before it was ultimately rejected by federal courts. In his decision, Judge Denny Chin stated the settlement agreement would "give Google a significant advantage over competitors, rewarding it for engaging in wholesale copying of copyrighted works without permission," and could lead to antitrust issues. Judge Chin said in future open-access initiatives, Google should use an "opt-in" method, rather than providing copyright owners the option to "opt-out" of an arrangement.

After this controversy, Google took a different approach to intellectual property rights for the Google Arts & Culture. The platform's intellectual property policy is:

The high-resolution imagery of artworks featured on the platform site is owned by the museums, and these images may be subject to copyright laws around the world. The Street View imagery is owned by Google. All of the imagery on this site is provided for the sole purpose of enabling you to use and enjoy the benefit of the platform site, in the manner permitted by Google's Terms of Service. The normal Google Terms of Service apply to your use of the entire site.

The partner museum staff were able now to ask Google to blur out the images of certain works, which are still protected by copyrights. In a few cases, museums wanted to include artworks by modern and contemporary artists, many of whom still hold the copyright to their works. For example, Tate Britain approached Chris Ofili to get his permission to capture and reproduce his works on the platform. But the Toledo Museum of Art asked Google to remove 21 artworks from the website, including works by Henri Matisse and other modern artists.

== Praise ==
- Increases access to art. So long as one has internet access, anyone, anywhere, at any time can visit the Google Arts & Culture, enabling audiences who otherwise would be unlikely to visit these museums to see their works. "Armchair tourists" are now able to tour some of the world's greatest art exhibits without leaving their seats. Professors and students can go on virtual field trips without the usual associated costs, and have a remote conversation with an expert from a museum or other institution.
- Better visitor experience. Users can avoid constraints of time, money and physical difficulty. They need not plan a restrictive one-time visit to a collection, or arrive to find out work is not on view. They are not bothered by other visitors.
- Triggers new visitors. Julian Raby, director of the Freer Gallery of Art, has posited that online exhibitions would drive more people to the gallery, and the Google Arts & Culture has supported this theory. The research found that most attendees of the virtual tour wanted to visit the museum afterwards and established a relationship between those who visit the platform and those who are inspired to go on a real tour of a museum. In further support of this concept, within two weeks of the launch of the platform, MoMA saw its website's traffic increase by about 7%. It is, however, unclear how many physical visitors came to MoMA as a result of the platform.
- Complements real visits to a gallery. While there has been some skepticism that the Google Arts & Culture seeks to replace real-time visits to art galleries, many have suggested that the virtual tours actually complement real-time visits. Research shows that people are more likely to enjoy their real-time visit to a museum after participating in a virtual tour. Several museum personnel have supported this concept anecdotally. Julian Raby, director of the Freer Gallery of Art stated: "The gigapixel experience brings us very close to the essence of the artist through detail that simply can't be seen in the gallery itself. Far from eliminating the necessity of seeing artworks in person, [Arts & Culture] deepens our desire to go in search of the real thing." This view was shared by Brian Kennedy, director of the Toledo Museum of Art, who believed that academics would still want to view artwork in three dimensions, even if the gigapixel images provided better clarity than viewing the artwork in the gallery. Similarly, Amit Sood—the Google project leader—said that "nothing beats the first-person experience".
- Has future development potential. Some scholars and art critics believe the Google Arts & Culture will change how museums use the web. For instance, Nancy Proctor—Head of Mobile Strategy & Initiatives at the Smithsonian—suggested that museums may eventually utilize the platform to provide museum maps and gallery information instead of printed materials. It might become possible for museum visitors to hold up their smartphone in front of an artwork, and the platform could overlay information. the platform could also provide a seamless transition from a Google Map to an inside gallery map, avoiding the need for printed collateral.
- Democratization of culture. With the rapid increase of information that is available online, we are in a period of democratization of knowledge. An elite group of professionals and experts are no longer the only people with the ability to distribute respected information. Rather, through web-based initiatives like Wikipedia, anyone with web access can contribute to and help shape public knowledge.
- Democratizing Art. The Google Arts & Culture is, according to some, a democratic initiative. The project has been cited as an art history's example of transforming knowledge to digital forms. It aims to give more people access to art by removing barriers like cost and location. Some art or cultural exhibits have been limited to a small group of viewers (e.g. PhD students, academic researchers) due to deteriorating conditions of work, lack of available wall space in a museum, or other similar factors. Digitized reproductions, however, can be accessible to anyone from any location. This type of online resource can transform research and academia by opening access to previously exclusive artworks, enabling multidisciplinary and multi-institutional learning. It provides people the opportunity to experience art individually, and a platform to become involved in the conversation. For example, the platform now lets users contribute their own content, adding their insight to the public collection of knowledge.
- Shift away from the canon of high art. Many scholars have argued that we are experiencing a breakdown of the canon of high art, and the Google Arts & Culture is beginning to reflect this. When it just included the Grand Masters of Western Art, the project faced strong criticism. As a result of this outburst, the website now includes some indigenous and graffiti artworks. This platform also provides a new context through which people encounter art, ultimately reflecting this shift away from the canon of high art.

== Criticism ==
- Eurocentrism: During its initial launch, many critics argued that Google Arts & Culture provided a Western-biased representation of art. Most museums included in the first phase of the Project were from Western Europe, Washington, D.C., and New York, N.Y. According to Diana Skaar, head of partnerships for the platform, Google responded: "After the launch of round one, we got an overwhelming response from museums worldwide. So for round two, we really wanted to balance regional museums with those that are more nationally or globally recognized." Now, the platform's expanded repository includes graffiti works, dot paintings, rock art, and indigenous artworks. However, the study of the project's coverage as of 2019 found that its collection is dominated by images from a few Western countries, capital cities, and 20th century art. Many countries have no provider institutions, and Kazakstan in particular was mostly represented through NASA photos.
- Selection of content: Although Google Arts & Culture partners with more than a hundred museums, some critics believe it still may present a skewed representation of art and art history. An art critic Alastair Sooke, writing for The Daily Telegraph in 2011, points out omissions of notable works and museums from the collection. Google and the partner museums are able to decide what information to include, and what artworks they will make available (and at what level of quality); Sooke believes this is counter-intuitive to the website's seemingly democratic objective. For example, in the White House virtual collection, one photo of a former First Lady does not include a key piece of information to understand the context of the image. Grace Coolidge often wore brightly colored clothes. In her White House portrait, she was dressed in a red sleeveless flapper dress and stood next to a large white dog. There are two versions of this picture: one showing Coolidge on a white background with softer lines, and one showing her on the White House lawn. The Google Arts & Culture description leaves out the reason for why there are two images. President Coolidge preferred his wife to wear a white dress. The artist, however, wanted the dress to contrast with the white dog. President Coolidge then retorted, "Dye the dog!" While perhaps not crucial to understanding the exhibit, this and other examples show that Google Arts & Culture and partner museums are in a position of power to curate the content and educational information of the virtual exhibition.
- Audience: Some critics have expressed concern over the intended audience of the platform, as this should shape the type of content available through the platform. For example, Director of the Center for the Future of Museums, Elizabeth Merritt, described the project as an "interesting experiment" but was skeptical as to its intended audience.
- Possible security risks: Some critics have raised the question of how Arts & Culture visitors might maliciously use the Street View images. For example, using highly detailed images of galleries, people could use this platform to map out museum security systems, and then be able to circumvent these protective measures during a break-in.

== Timeline of introductions ==
All of these museums have an adapted version of Google Street View designed to photograph building interiors.

=== 2011 ===
Release date	Major locations added
February 1	(United States) Freer Gallery of Art, Frick Collection, Metropolitan Museum of Art, MoMA (Russia) Tretyakov Gallery, Hermitage Museum (Germany) Alte Nationalgalerie, Gemäldegalerie (Spain) Museo Reina Sofia, Thyssen-Bornemisza Museum (Czech Republic) Museum Kampa (United Kingdom) National Gallery, Tate Britain (France) Palace of Versailles (Italy) Uffizi Gallery (Netherlands) Van Gogh Museum, Rijksmuseum Amsterdam
August 16	National Museum of Iraq

=== 2012 ===
Release date	Major locations added
March 22	(Russia) State Russian Museum
April 3	The Israel Museum (United States) J. Paul Getty Museum (United States) Museum of Fine Arts, Houston (Sweden) Nationalmuseum
April 4	(United States) Museum of Fine Arts (United States) De Young Museum (United States) The Nelson-Atkins Museum of Art
April 6	(Russia) Pushkin Museum
April 7	(United States) Indianapolis Museum of Art
May 29	National Gallery of Denmark
June 23	(United States) Computer History Museum
December 17	(Finland) Ateneum

=== 2013 ===
Release date	Major locations added
March 27	(Hungary) Museum of Applied Arts
April 4	(Luxembourg) Mudam
April 8	(United States) Corning Museum of Glass
April 29	(Peru) Larco Museum
May 20	(Switzerland) Beyeler Foundation
May 21	(Norway) The National Museum of Art, Architecture and Design (Denmark) Thorvaldsen Museum
May 22	(Austria) Kunsthistorisches Museum
October 7	(South Korea) National Museum of Korea
October 21	(Qatar) Museum of Islamic Art
October 31	(Republic of Ireland) National Library of Ireland
December 6	(Brazil) Inhotim, Iberê Camargo Foundation, Moreira Salles Institute, Museu da Imagem e do Som

=== 2014 ===
Release date	Major locations added
January 30	(Colombia) Museum of Contemporary Art of Bogotá
June 23	(Slovakia) Slovak National Gallery (Slovakia) Ernest Zmeták Art Gallery (Slovakia) Stredoslovenská galéria
August 20	(Canada) The Royal Ontario Museum
September 16	(United States) Pueblo Grande Museum
September 29	(Germany) Deutsches Museum
October 27	(Japan) National Museum of Western Art (Japan) National Museum of Modern Art (Japan) Ohara Museum of Art (Japan) Kobe City Museum (Japan) Kobe Fashion Museum (Japan) Saitama Prefectural Museum of the Sakitama Ancient Burial Mounds (Japan) Shizuoka Prefectural Museum of Art (Japan) Shizuoka City Tokaido Hiroshige Museum (Japan) Shohaku Art Museum
November 25	(Romania) Brukenthal National Museum

=== 2015 ===
Release date	Major locations added
January 28	(Canada) The Vancouver Art Gallery
February 15	(Slovakia) Liptovská galéria Petra Michala Bohúňa
March 2	Queensland Museum; Australian War Memorial; National Museum of Australia; National Portrait Gallery; Powerhouse Museum, Australian Centre for the Moving Image; Public Record Office Victoria
March 3	National Museum of Indonesia
March 21	(United Arab Emirates) The Barjeel Art Foundation
April 24	(South Africa) Robben Island Museum
May 21	Hong Kong Museum of Medical Sciences Hong Kong Maritime Museum
June 18	(South Korea) National Museum of Modern and Contemporary Art
July 6	(United States) National Cowboy & Western Heritage Museum
July 14	(Mexico) Museo Dolores Olmedo
September 19	(China) Hubei Provincial Museum
November 12	(United Kingdom) The British Museum

=== 2016 ===
Release date	Major locations added
January 21	(Brazil) Museu Afro Brasil (India) Dr. Bhau Daji Lad Museum
February 11	(Croatia) Museum of Arts and Crafts
February 12	(United States) Florida State University Museum of Fine Arts
March 10	(United States) The Frick Pittsburgh
April 26	(Australia) Sydney Opera House
May 3	(South Korea) Silhak Museum
May 20	(France) Museum of Fine Arts of Lyon
July 19	(United Kingdom) Dulwich Picture Gallery
July 20	The National Museum of Mongolia
July 22	(India) Indian Museum (India) Salar Jung Museum (India) Nehru Memorial Museum & Library (India) National Gallery of Moden Art
August 25	China Paper Cutting Museum (China) Hangzhou Arts and Crafts Museum
September 13	(Russia) State Darwin Museum
September 19	(South Korea) Gwacheon National Science Museum
October 7	(South Korea) Seodaemun Museum of Natural History
October 26	(Estonia) Tallinn City Museum
November 3	(Mexico) Museo Nacional de la Muerte (Mexico) Museo Mexicano de Diseño (Mexico) Museo de Arte Popular
November 21	(France) Cinémathèque Française
December 12	(China) The Geyuan Garden (China) The He Garden (China) The Museum of the Tomb of Han Guangling King
December 15	(United States) New Orleans Museum of Art

=== 2017 ===
Release date	Major locations added
February 15	(New Zealand) Auckland Art Gallery Toi o Tāmaki
March 25	(Japan) Art Research Center in the Ritsumeikan University
June 5	(Malta) National Museum of Archaeology
June 6	(Brazil) Museu Nacional de Belas Artes
June 8	(Guatemala) Ixchel Museum
June 12	Imperial Museum of Brazil (Spain) Museo del Traje (Spain) Design Museum of Barcelona (Spain) Museum of Arts and Popular Customs of Seville
June 13	(United Kingdom) The Hepworth Wakefield Museum
June 14	(Belgium) ModeMuseum Antwerpen
July 8	(Philippines) Malacañang Museum
July 20	(Japan) Bunka Gakuen University
September 20	(France) Museum of European and Mediterranean Civilizations
October 24	(United States) Intrepid Sea, Air & Space Museum
November 13	(Spain) Gran Teatre del Liceu
November 24	(India) Chhatrapati Shivaji Maharaj Vastu Sangrahalaya
December 30	(India) Partition Museum

=== 2018 ===
Release date	Major locations added
January 5	(Mexico) Papalote Museo del Niño
February 27	(France) Musée des Confluences
March 7	(Brazil) São Paulo Art Biennial
March 13	(Brazil) Centro Cultural Banco do Brasil São Paulo (South Korea) Korea International Cooperation Agency (United Kingdom) The National Museum of Scotland
March 22	(South Korea) Korea National Maritime Museum
May 23	(Lithuania) Lithuanian National Museum of Art
May 27	(Mexico) Frida Kahlo Museum
June 21	China National Silk Museum (South Korea) Gyeongju National Museum (South Korea) Sookmyung Women's University Museum (South Korea) National Palace Museum of Korea
July 23	(Costa Rica) Centro Costarricense de Ciencia y Cultura (Costa Rica) Museo del Jade
September	(Lebanon) American University of Beirut
October 2	(Italy) Biblioteca Sormani (Italy) Museo delle Culture (Italy) Museo del Novecento (Italy) Museo Civico di Storia Naturale di Milano
October 10	(Poland) National Museum of Kraków
November 13	(United Kingdom) Dumfries House
December 3	(Netherlands) Mauritshuis

=== 2019 ===
Release date	Major locations added
January 15	(Portugal) National Museum of Ancient Art (Portugal) Museu de Arte Popular (Portugal) National Museum of Ethnology (Portugal) Grão Vasco National Museum (Portugal) National Archaeology Museum
January 17	(Portugal) Museu Nacional da Música
February 26	(France) Monnaie de Paris
March 4	(France) Musée Pasteur
March 6	(Germany) Röntgen-Gedächtnisstätte (Spain) Real Academia Nacional de Medicina de España (Spain) Museo Naval de Madrid
March 9	(Germany) Museums for Communication in Berlin, Frankfurt & Nuremberg
March 14	(Germany) Deutsches Röntgen-Museum
April 18	(Republic of Ireland) The Royal Irish Academy
June 12	(Netherlands) Anne Frank House
June 17	(France) Musée des Beaux-Arts de Quimper
June 18	(France) Le Carton voyageur
June 20	(China) Power Station of Art
June 24	(India) Blades of Glory Cricket Museum
July 9	(South Korea) Appenzeller Noble Memorial Museum
July 10	(Mexico) Museo Soumaya
July 30	(Thailand) Thai Film Archive
August 19	(Australia) Gallery of Modern Art
August 21	(Australia) National Motor Museum
September 17	(Thailand) The Front Palace
September 18	(Thailand) Thai Flag Museum
October 31	(Kenya) Nairobi National Museum
November 12	(Taiwan) National Palace Museum

=== 2020 ===
Release date	Major locations added
January 24	(Spain) Museo Parroquial de Tapices de Pastrana
February 6	(Czech Republic) The National Museum of Prague
February 28	(United Kingdom) The Tank Museum
March 4	(Taiwan) Fo Guang Shan Buddha Museum
March 17	(Austria) The Leopold Museum
March 18	(Sweden) The Museum of World Culture (United States) National Portrait Gallery
March 19	(Sweden) Livrustkammaren
March 20	(Austria) Österreichische Galerie Belvedere
March 22	Insect Museum of West China
March 25	(United Kingdom) Garden Museum
April 6	(Germany) Alte Pinakothek
April 17	(India) Royal Opera House of Mumbai
April 21	(Mexico) Cineteca Nacional de México
April 27	(Mexico) Foto Museo Cuatro Caminos
April 29	(Japan) Nakamura Keith Haring Collection
May 1	(Japan) Wajima Museum of Urushi Art
May 7	(Italy) La Scala
May 13	(Spain) Museo de la Guardia Civil
May 18	(Argentina) Museo Nacional de Bellas Artes (Germany) The Ludwig Roselius Museum (Germany) The Paula Modersohn-Becker Museum (Italy) Casa Buonarroti (Italy) Science and Technology Foundation Museum^{[it]} (Italy) Città della Scienza
May 19	(Japan) The Meiji Shrine (Japan) The Sezon Museum of Modern Art
May 20	(Italy) The Museum of Radiology^{[it]} (United Kingdom) The Foundling Museum (France) Musée des impressionnismes Giverny
June 17	(Germany) Leipzig Bach Archive
June 18	(United Kingdom) Royal Academy of Arts
July 14	(South Korea) Lee Ungno Museum
July 30	(United States) Grohmann Museum (United States) Milwaukee Public Museum
August 12	(United States) Levine Museum of the New South
September 7	(Germany) The Hamburg Port Museum^{[de]}
September 17	(Germany) The Museum of Man and Nature (France) Mobilier National
October 6	The National Taiwan Museum of Fine Arts
November 14	(China) Only a few museums around Shenzhen only.
November 17	(Brazil) Museu de Arte da Bahia
November 20	(France) The Electropolis Museum
November 25	(Germany) The Folkwang Museum
December 3	(Germany) Beethoven House
December 11	(South Korea) Gwangju Biennale
December 30	(South Korea) Yoon Dongju Memorial Hall in Yonsei University

=== 2021 ===
Release date	Major locations added
February 21	(Portugal) Museu do Douro
March 10	(Germany) Berlin Musical Instrument Museum
March 11	(France) École Polytechnique
March 26	(China) Song Art Museum
March 29	(United States) Gloria Steinem's Historic Manhattan Apartment
April 26	(Brazil) São Paulo Metro
April 28	(Nigeria) African Artists' Foundation (Nigeria) Rele Art Gallery (Nigeria) Terra Kulture
May 18	(Australia) Sydney Jewish Museum
June 18	(Brazil) Villa-Lobos Museum
July 12	(Germany) Bayerische Staatsoper
July 23	(Italy) Palazzo del Giardino (Italy) Castello dei Burattini - Museo Giordano Ferrari (Italy) Sala Baganza Wine Museum (Italy) Casa della Musica (Parma) (Italy) Fondazione Museo Glauco Lombardi (Italy) Museum of Parmigiano Reggiano (Italy) Museo Ettore Guatelli (Thailand) The Office of Arts and Culture in Suan Sunandha Rajabhat University
August 22	(Switzerland) Tonhalle Zürich
September 19	(Mexico) MUCHO Museo del Chocolate
September 28	(United States) Mattress Factory (United States) The Clemente Museum (United States) Pittsburgh Glass Center
October 6	(South Africa) Wits University Origins Centre
October 8	(Nigeria) Yemisi Shyllon Museum of Art
October 14	(China) Simatai Great Wall Tourist Area
October 20	(Poland) Royal Łazienki Museum (Poland) Museum of Folk Musical Instruments in Szydlowiec (Poland) Fryderyk Chopin Institute
October 21	(Slovakia) Bratislava Theatre Institute
November 11	(Brazil) Supreme Federal Court
November 22	(Italy) Quirinal Palace
December 3	National and University Library of Slovenia; Beekeeping Museum in Radovljica; Posavje Museum Brežice

=== 2022 ===
Release date	Major locations added

=== 2023 ===
Release date	Major locations added
March 30	Museum Tripods for Google Arts and Culture in Lesser Poland Voivodeship including Żupny Castle, Szołayski House National Museum, Zbaraski Palace
April 16	(South Korea) Daegu Concert House in Daegu (Italy) Ca' Granda at University of Milan
June 17	(United States) Tripods in San Antonio, Texas including Casa Navarro, Ruby City, Briscoe Western Art Museum, Witte Museum

=== 2024 ===
Release date	Major locations added

=== 2025 ===
Release date	Major locations added

== Similar initiatives ==
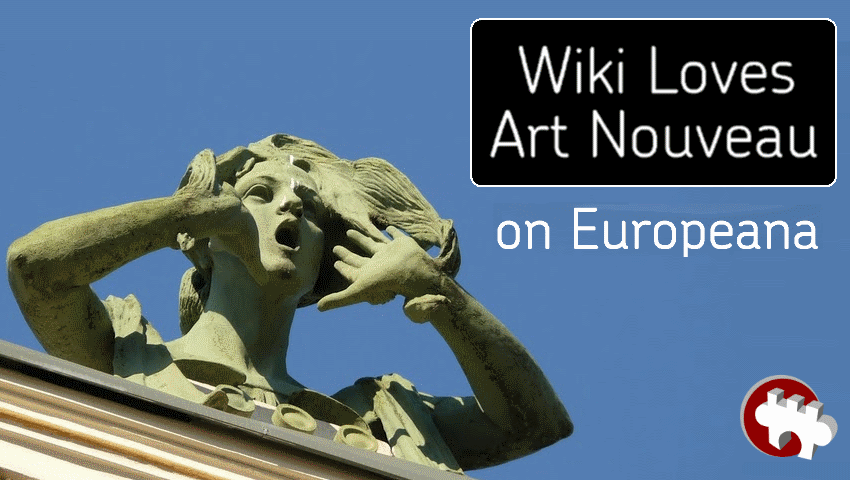
Banner for Wiki Loves Art Nouveau Exhibition on Europeana

Many museums and arts organizations have created their own online data and virtual exhibitions. Some offer virtual 3-D tours similar to the Google Arts & Culture's gallery view, whereas others simply reproduce images from their collection on the institution's web page. Some museums have collections that exist solely in cyberspace and are known as virtual museums.

- Bucharest Natural History Museum and the Museum of the Romanian Peasant offer virtual tours of two of Romania's larger historical/anthropological museums.
- Europeana is a virtual repository of artworks, literature, cultural objects, relics, and musical recordings/writings from over 2000 European institutions.
- Public Catalogue Foundation has digitized all the circa 210,000 oil paintings in public ownership in the United Kingdom, and made the paintings viewable by the public through a series of affordable catalogs and, in partnership with the BBC, the "Your Paintings" website. Works by some 40,000 painters are included.
- Khan Academy's smARThistory is a multimedia resource with videos, audio guides, mobile applications and commentary from art historians.
- The Prado launched a virtual collection, in collaboration with Google Earth, in January 2009. The website contained photos of 14 Prado paintings, each with up to 14 gigapixels.
- The Virtual Museum of Canada is a virtual collection containing exhibits from thousand of Canadian local, provincial and national museums.
- Wikipedia GLAM ("galleries, libraries, archives, and museums", also including botanic and zoological gardens) helps cultural institutions share their resources with the world through collaborative projects with experienced Wikipedia editors.

== Sources ==
- "Google Art: See Paintings like never before", BananaBandy, June 6, 2016. Retrieved on June 6, 2016.
- Kennicott, Philip (February 1, 2011). "National Treasures: Google Art Project Unlocks Riches of World's Galleries". The Washington Post.
- "Google Art Project: The 7 Billion Pixel Masterpieces". The Daily Telegraph. London. February 1, 2011. Archived from the original on January 12, 2022.
- Tremlett, Giles (January 14, 2009). "Online gallery zooms in on Prado's masterpieces (even the smutty bits)". The Guardian. London.
- Waters, Florence (February 1, 2011). "The Best Online Culture Archives". The Daily Telegraph. London.
