= Shunran-no-Sato =

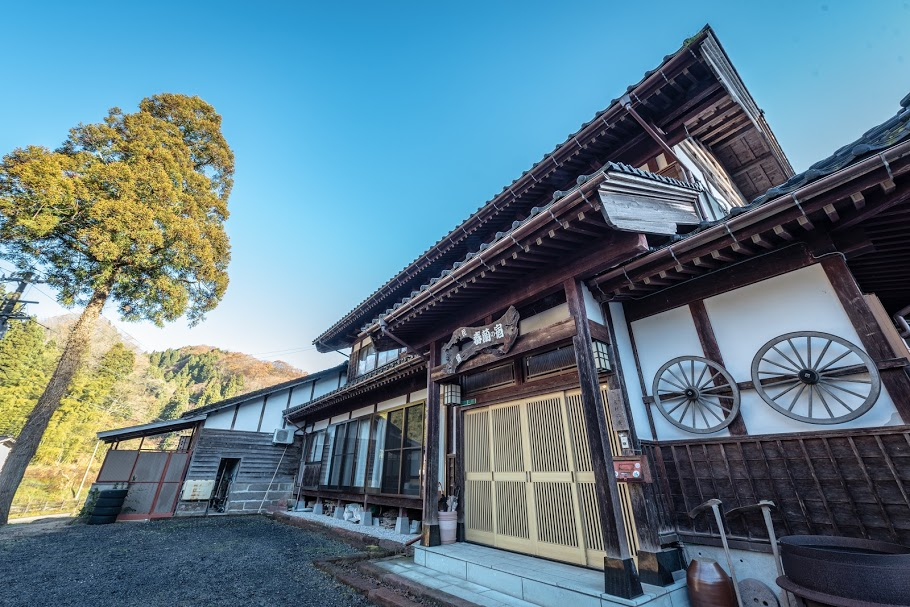
Shunran-no-Yado, the first Japanese inn

Shunran-no-Sato (Japanese: 春蘭の里) are a group of farmhouse inns in Ishikawa Prefecture of Japan, known as some of the first farmhouse inns in Japan. As of 2018, there were 49 inns in total. As a successful case of rural revitalization, they are frequently referred to media, papers and other villages to solve problems of regional depopulation.

== History ==
The Noto Peninsula, where the inns are located, is part of a Globally Important Agricultural Heritage System. In 1996, Shunran-no-Sato Executive Committee was established in order to revitalize Noto town areas which had decreased population. The next year, the first farmhouse inn, Shunran-no-Yado (Japanese: 春蘭の宿), was founded by Kiichiro Tada. The inns have gradually increased in number over time. Shunran-no-Sato was introduced as a representative of SATOYAMA regarding accepting excursions at Biodiversity Contract 10th Conference Of Parties (COP10) in October 2010. In addition, BBC World News nominated them in the 4th place at World Challenge 2011 which broadcast some approaches to solve regional problems in October 2011, and Crown Prince Naruhito visited there in 29 October 2013. As of 2016, the number of visitors per year had increased more than 10,000 by carrying out promotions to not only individuals but also groups.

== Features ==
There are 40 guest houses which accommodate irori (Japanese-style fireplaces). Local cuisine may be served on wajima-nuri lacquer ware. Available activities include agriculture, picking wild vegetables, chopping wood, rice farming, and fishing.

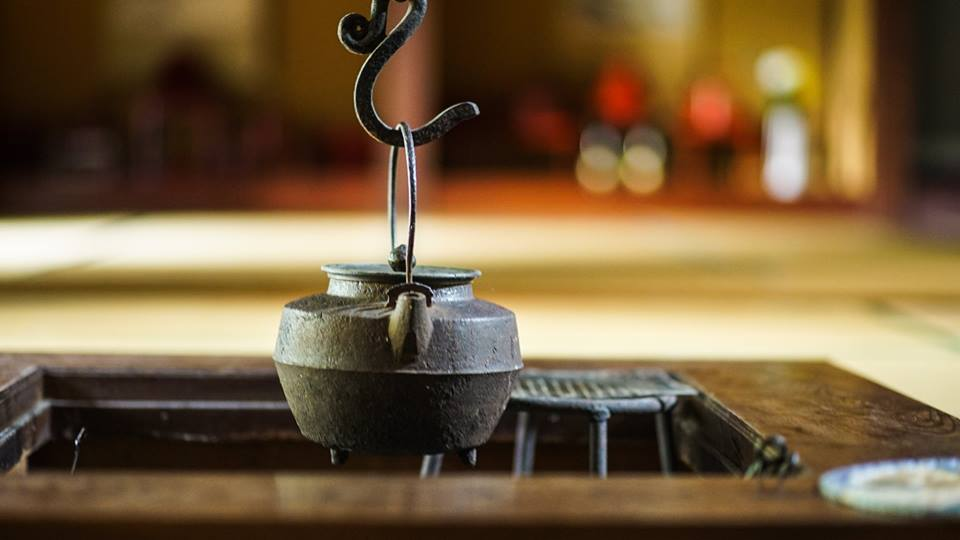
Irori, the Japanese-style fireplace in Shunran-no-Yado

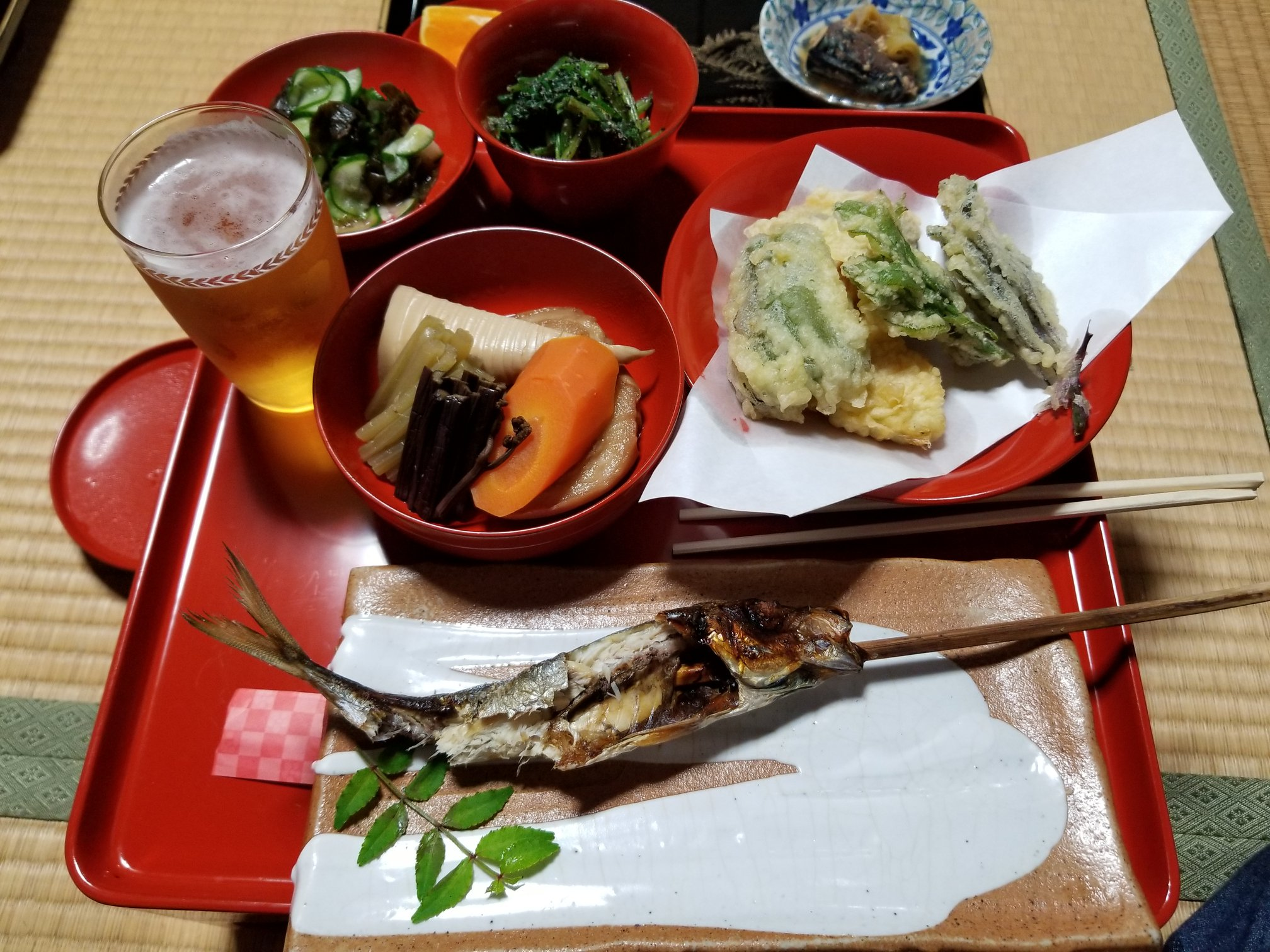
Local cuisine on wajima-nuri lacquer ware
