= Ballroom Throwbacks Television =

Digital media platform and archive of ballroom culture

- Website type: Digital media platform
- Available in: English
- Creator: Ceasar Williams
- Website: brtbtv.com
- Commercial: Yes
- Registration: Subscription required for some content
- Launched: March 2009; 17 years ago
- Current status: Active

Ballroom Throwbacks Television (BRTB TV, often stylized BRTBTV) is a digital media platform and YouTube channel that documents the U.S. ballroom scene. It was founded in 2009 by cultural archivist Ceasar Williams and is widely used for footage of balls, runway categories and voguing across the contemporary scene.

== History ==
Williams began uploading archival ballroom footage to YouTube in March 2009, expanding the channel into a broader media outlet with event coverage, commentary and post‑ball interviews. The channel has been described in LGBTQ media as an “official gateway” to ballroom culture and a repository of scene history.

== Content and programming ==
BRTB TV’s videos typically cover runway and performance categories (such as vogue, face, runway, realness and sex siren) and include organizer announcements, judges’ panels, and post‑event interviews. Its uploads serve as a reference point for community participants and for audiences discovering ballroom online.

== Collaborations and archival work ==
In 2023, Google Arts & Culture partnered with the Bronx‑based LGBTQ center Destination Tomorrow and ballroom expert Ceasar Williams on Ballroom in Focus, billed as the largest online collection of ballroom archival material. The project digitized more than 1,000 images and launched over two dozen curated stories; several pages were adapted from interviews with Williams.

== Events and affiliations ==
BRTB TV is associated with the Haus of Alpha Omega (AlphaΩ), which stages large‑scale events in New York City. In March 2023 the house hosted the BRTB TV Awards Ball at Knockdown Center in Queens; media coverage noted debut walks and prizes at the event. Earlier that same month, TENz Magazine covered Alpha Omega’s Anarchy 2023 ball, describing the house as led by “Ballroom Throwbacks founder Ceasar.”

== Streaming and scripted projects ==
BRTB TV also operates a subscription streaming site (BRTBtv.com) that distributes the long‑running scripted series Triangle and related programming. A 2016 release from the District of Columbia’s Office of Cable Television, Film, Music & Entertainment credited Triangle’s success with helping launch the BRTBtv network and noted recognition from Black LGBTQ organizations.

== Reception and influence ==
Mainstream coverage has cited BRTB TV’s role in making contemporary ballroom more visible to wider audiences and in providing an accessible archive for participants and scholars.

== See also ==
- Ball culture
