= MACBA =

MACBA may refer to:

- Museum of Contemporary Art of Buenos Aires, Argentina
- Barcelona Museum of Contemporary Art (Museu d'Art Contemporani de Barcelona), Spain
