= Hangzhou Arts and Crafts Museum =

- Chinese: 杭州工艺美术博物馆
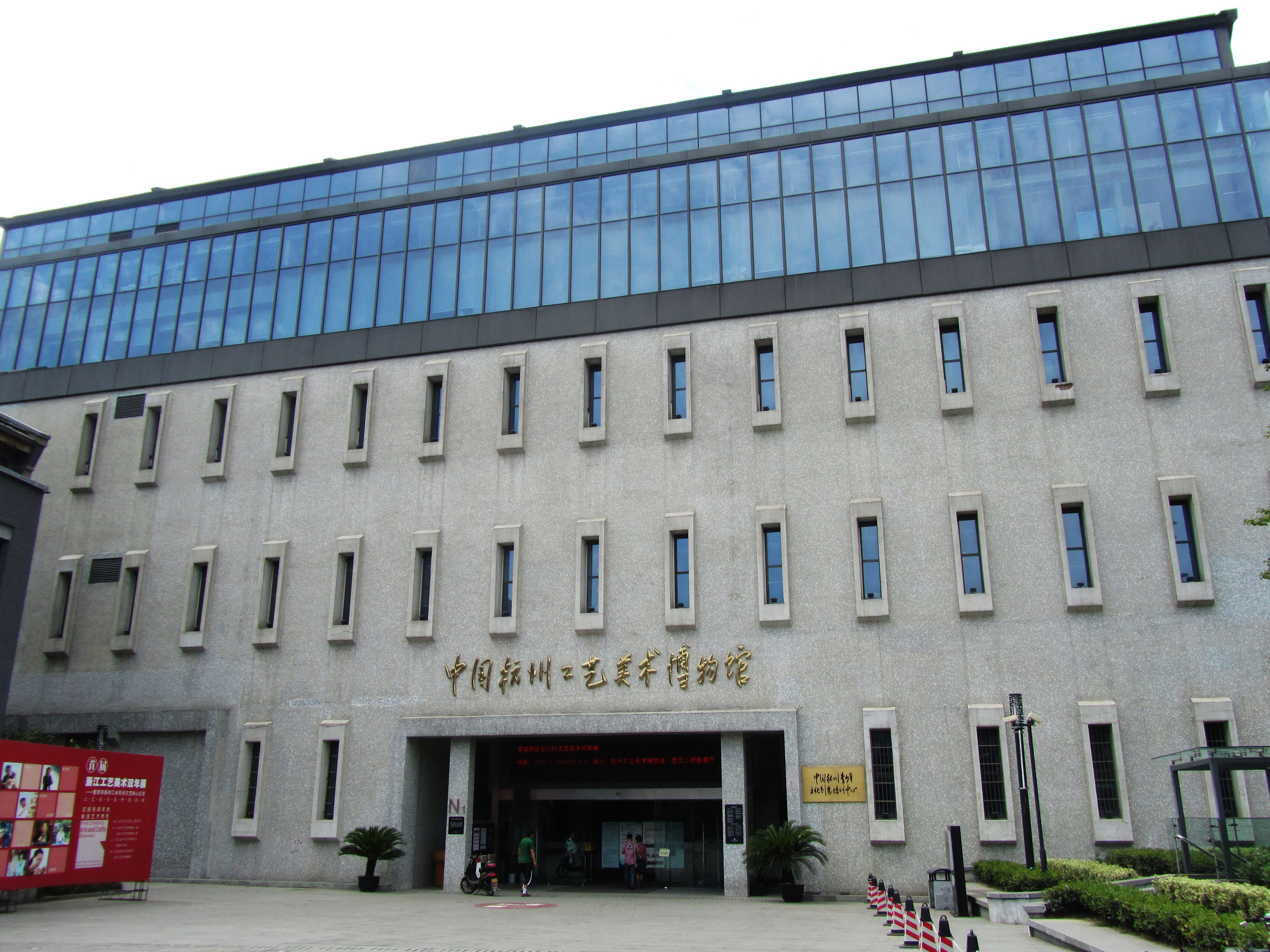
- Hangzhou Arts and Crafts Museum in 2013

- Location within Zhejiang Location within China
- Established: 2011
- Location: Hangzhou, China
- Coordinates: 30°19′15″N 120°08′00″E
- Type: Art museum
- Website: www.zgdjss.com

The Hangzhou Arts and Crafts Museum (Chinese: 杭州工艺美术博物馆) is a museum in Hangzhou, China.

== History ==
The museum building was originally the Tonyi Gong yarn factory, which was founded in 1896, the factory was one of the largest cotton mills in Zhejiang province. In 2009, the Hangzhou municipal government decided to transform the building into a museum. In 2011, the museum opened for the first time. Also in 2013, craft sculptor Ye Lijia carved boxwoods sculptures at the museum. Since 2016, the museum has been part of the Google Arts & Culture platform. The museum won the 17th National Museum's Top Ten Exhibitions competition award in 2019 for the exhibition of "Mirage: Exhibition of Decorative Arts for Chinese Export Sales from the 17th to the 20th Century". In 2020, the museum organized a series of virtual courses in order to promote the cultural heritage of Hangzhou City.

== Collections ==
The museum is divided into 6 exhibition areas, it contains different artifacts such as sculptures, ceramics, and metal crafts, among the exhibits are a Xihu silk umbrella and Fuyang bamboo paper. The museum contains works by Chinese artists such as paintings by Tang Di, a copper decorative screen by Shaoxing artist Zhu Bingren. The museum also contains works by Hangzhou artist Chen Shuiqin and Qingtian artist Wu Songjiang. In addition, the museum contains oil paper parasols from the southeastern part of Fujian Province dating back to the 21st century. In September 2012, an exhibition called "Porcelain in the Universe-Large-scale Art and Life Ceramic Exhibition" was organized, which included works of more than 50 arts and crafts masters from different municipalities and provinces of China. The museum contains Qingtian Stone Carvings, in 2015, activities related to these stone carvings were held in the museum. In April 2018, the museum collaborated with Hong Kong's Liang Yi Museum to hold an exhibition called "Pandora's Box", which displays historical artifacts from Europe, and the Hangzhou Arts and Crafts Museum organized interactive activities around the jewelry exhibits. In March 2018, the museum launched an exhibition called "Cutting the first branch of the Spring Breeze-Scissors Culture Exhibition", in which scissors from China were displayed, moreover, part of the exhibition came from Shen Minghua's collection. In May 2019, the museum launched an exhibition about Chinese ceramics, this exhibition contained more than 120 works from famous ceramic production areas, this exhibition was in collaboration with Hong Kong Chinese Ceramic Sculpture Research Association. In December 2019, the museum presented an exhibition with bronze sculptures by Zhu Junmin, the exhibition ceremony was attended by Wang Yingxiang, Liu Xiaoping, Zhao Jianzhong and Feng Renqiang, the exhibition was supported by Hangzhou Civil Artists Association and Hangzhou Arts & Crafts Industry Association.

== Gallery ==
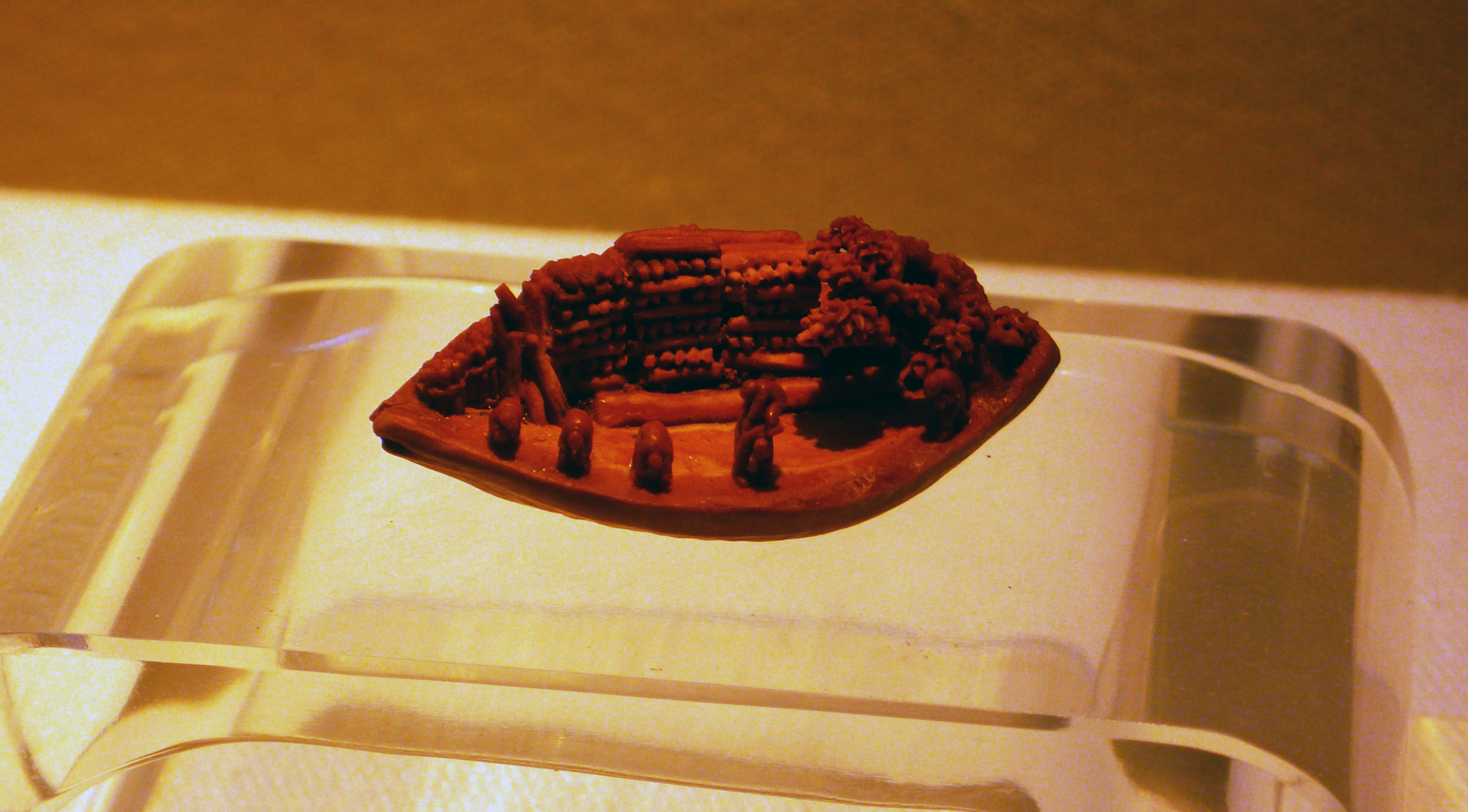

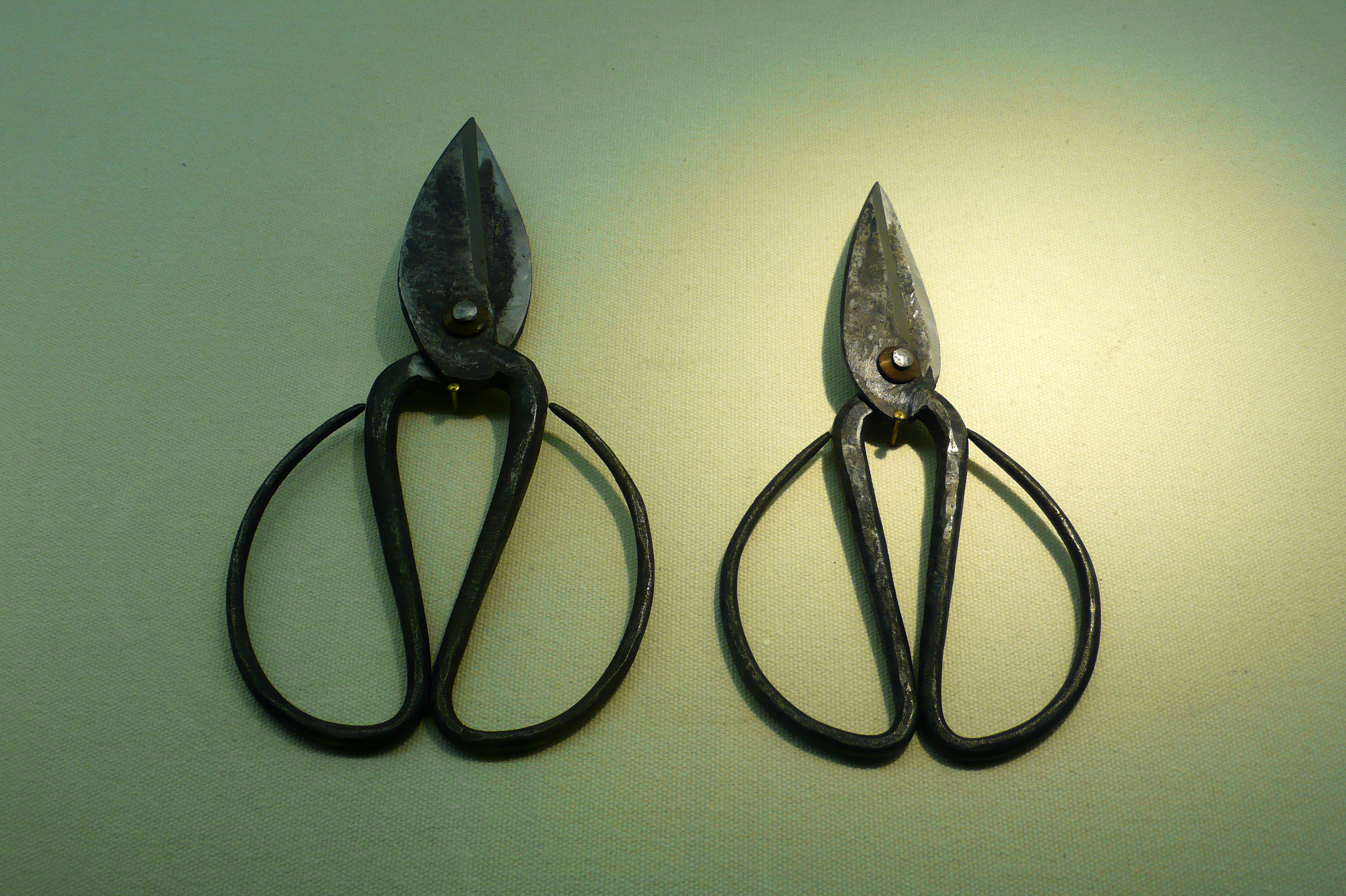

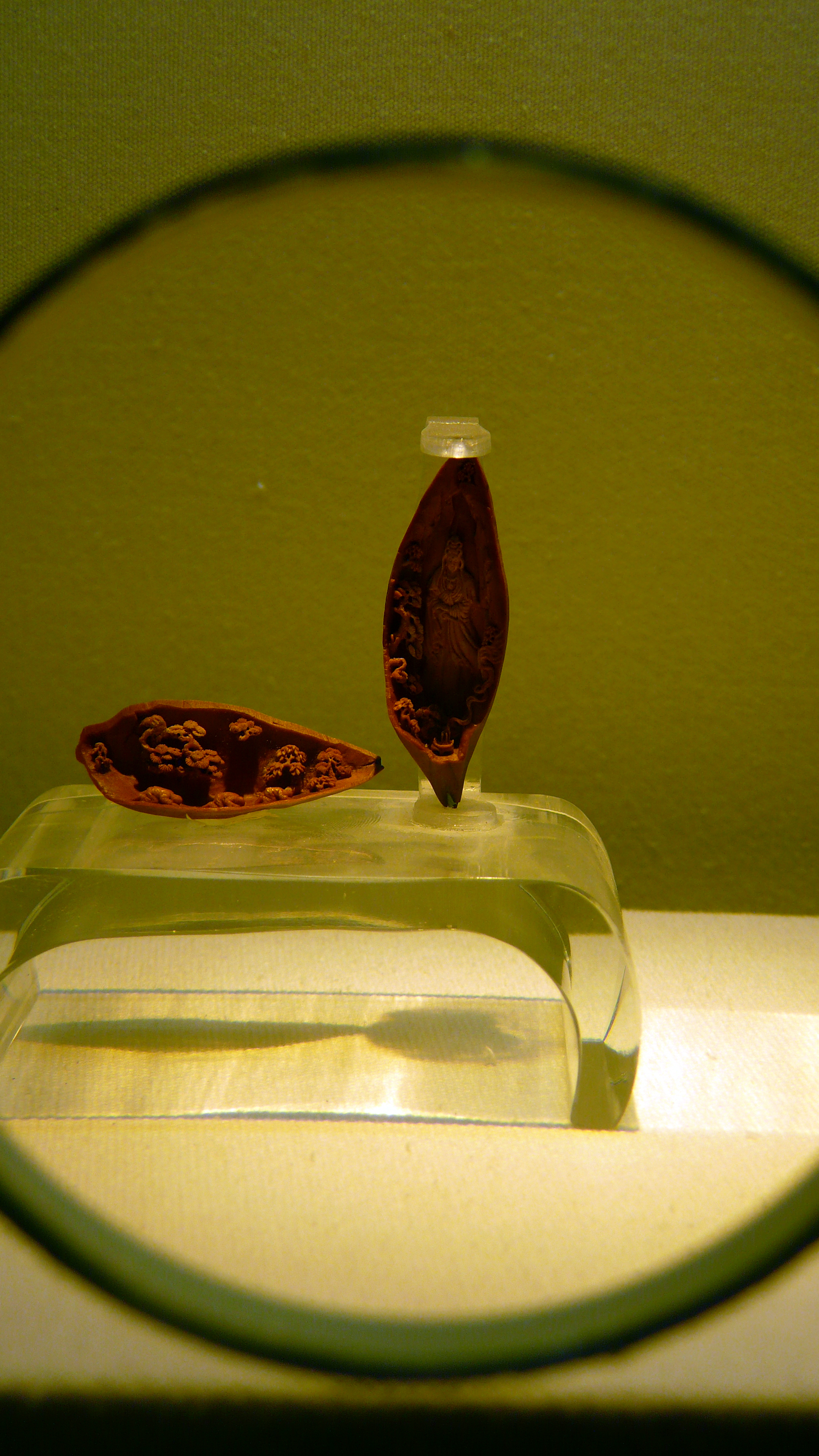
