= Museum of Contemporary Art of Bogotá =

Contemporary art museum in Bogotá

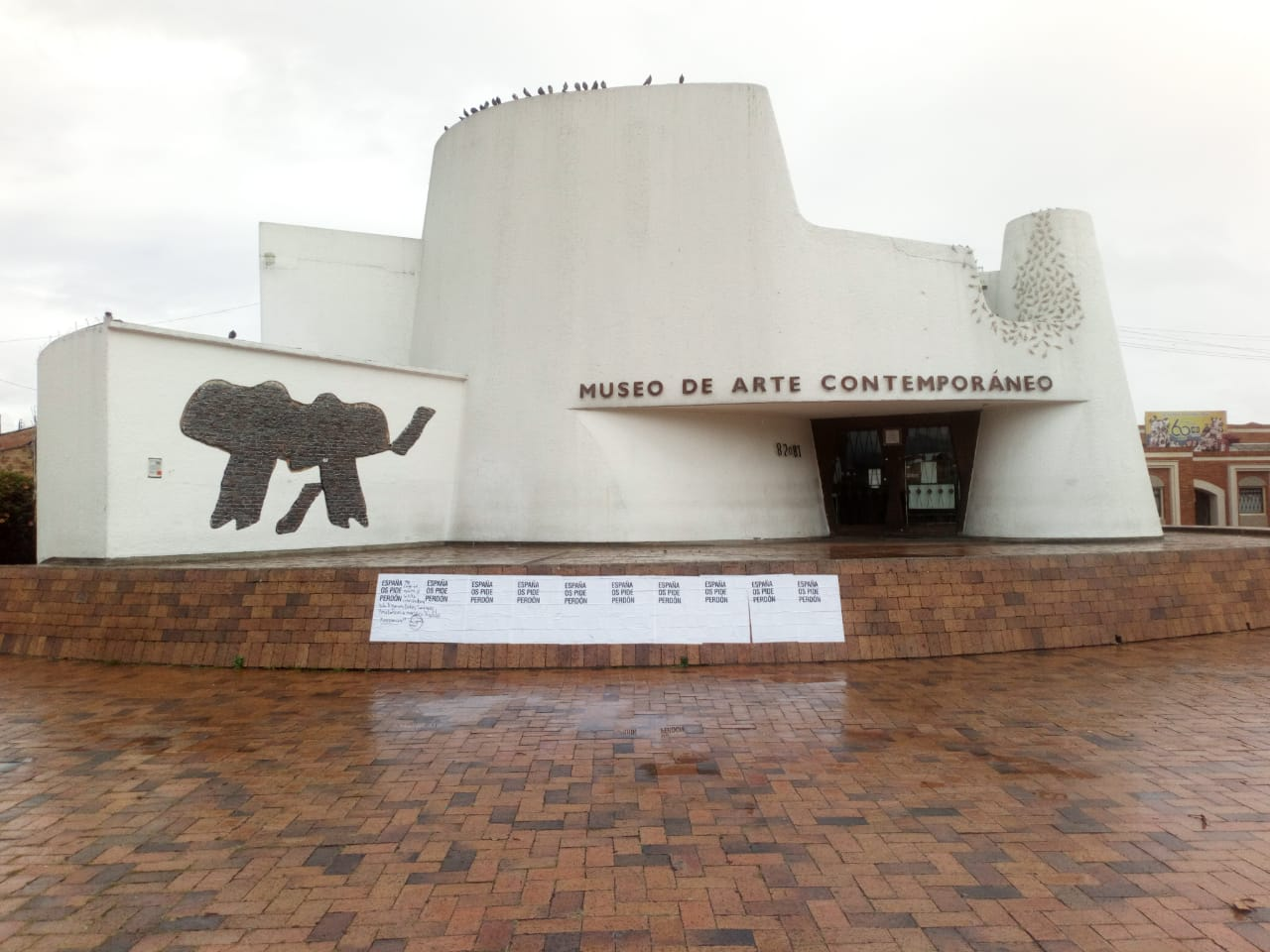
- Established: November 15, 1966; 59 years ago
- Location: Bogotá (Colombia)
- Coordinates: 4.6987°N 74.0905°W
- Type: Art Museum
- Website: www.mac.org.co

The Museum of Contemporary Art of Bogotá (Spanish: Museo de Arte Contemporáneo de Bogotá), also known by the acronym MAC, is an art museum located Engativá, Bogota. It is considered one of the most important museums in Bogotá.

== History ==
The museum was inaugurated November 25, 1966. The Colombian priest and leader of el Minuto de Dios, Rafael García Herreros, had called publicly three years earlier for the country to have a museum. One of the objectives with the founding of this museum was to preserve national heritage by collecting different artistic works produced in Colombia. Herreros went on to play a significant role in the museum's founding, and Germán Ferrer Barrera was its founding director.

The museum's building, designed by architects Jairo López and Eduardo del Valle was formally inaugurated by President Misael Pastrana Borrero in 1970. In 1971, the museum won the national architecture prize for the unique design of its building.

In 2009, in the main square of the museum, the process of expansion and renovation of the sculpture collection began.

== Collections ==
At the point of its founding, the museum's collection contained 55 works by 52 artists. The museum now has about 1,600 works of contemporary art in its permanent collection. In addition, its rooms can be visited virtually through an adapted version of Google Street View provided on the Google Arts & Culture platform.
