= Wajima Museum of Urushi Art =

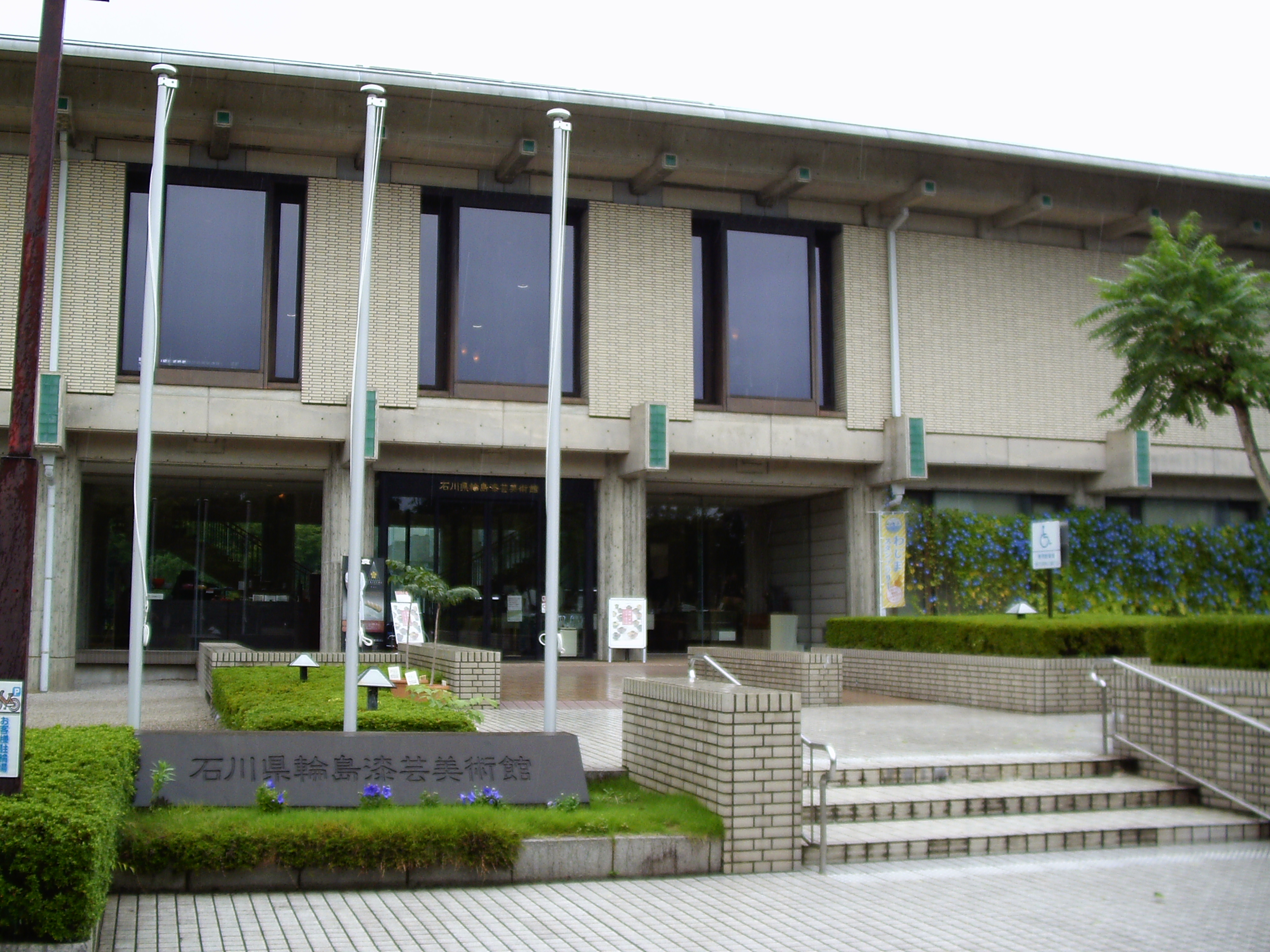
- Established: 1991
- Location: Wajima, Japan
- Coordinates: 37.3897993°N 136.892168°E
- Type: Art Museum
- Website: www.city.wajima.ishikawa.jp/art/home_english.html

The Wajima Museum of Urushi Art (Japanese: 石川県輪島漆芸美術館) is a museum located in Wajima, Japan. The museum specializes in lacquer art.

== History ==
The museum was opened in 1991, originally the museum contains 300 works at its opening, in 2021, it was recorded that there were 1428 works of art that the museum contained. In August 2020, the museum organized a virtual exhibition through the Google Arts & Culture platform. In June 2021, a ceremony was held for the expansion of the museum's storage. This is the first museum in Japan that specializes in lacquer art. The design of the building is inspired by Shogakuin's school building.

== Collections ==
The museum contains exhibits that explain the history and characteristics of lacquer art. The museum contains lacquer works by contemporary artists, as well as a lacquer ware collection from different countries of East and Southeast Asia. Some of the lacquer works come from people from art academies. The museum contains exhibits about Wajima-nuri. The museum contains videos about the Japanese lacquer ware. In November 2014, the museum hosted an exhibition called the "Wajima Lacquer Art Artists 20th Anniversary," displaying works by active local artists. In June 2015, the museum exhibited 70 works that come from the Edo period, these works were related to ghosts or demons of Japanese mythology. In September 2015, Kikumaki paintings made by lacquer artists were exhibited at the museum. In addition, in the September 2015 exhibition, the Maki-e Kaioke set, a tool used in weddings during the Edo period, was presented at the museum. In December 2020, the museum organized an exhibition with 45 lacquer works from seven different countries and regions, which also featured sake sets and bowls. In February 2021, the museum organized an exhibition of works by 153 students from five elementary schools, using Shikin's techniques, including carvings of flowers, cats, dragonflies and vines. In November 2021, in commemoration of the 30th anniversary of the opening of the museum, an exhibition was presented on the history of lacquer art in Wajima, called "Made in Wajima -The Age of Lacquer" featuring 92 works from latter half of the 19th century.
