= China Paper Cutting Museum =

Art museum in Yangzhou, China

- Established: 2007
- Location: Yangzhou, China
- Coordinates: 32.395640°N 119.446998°E
- Type: Art Museum
- Founder: Feng Yica

The China Paper Cutting Museum (Chinese: 中国剪纸博物馆) is a museum located in Yangzhou, China. The museum is dedicated to preserving paper art from China.

== History ==
The idea with the creation of this museum was originated by the Chairman of the Chinese Folk Literature and Art Association Feng Yica, with the purpose of preserving the paper cutting art of China. In April 2007, the museum was inaugurated. Since 2016, the museum has been part of the Google Arts & Culture platform. In 2017, the first paper cutting biennial exhibition in Yangzhou was organized in the museum, the exhibition is about different paper cutting techniques including works by Xiong Chongrong and Pang Jiandong. In 2020, the museum received 27 pieces of paper cutting art from different artists including Li Liefeng.

== Collections ==
The museum contains artifacts donated by the Chinese Folk Literature and Art Association, including objects from different periods of Chinese history. The museum contains cultural objects in addition to objects decoratively covered with lacquer. The museum contains paper-cut works by Zhang Xiufang and Zhang Muli, in addition the museum contains lamps decorated with paper cuts. In 2016, the museum organized an exhibition with works by Hsing Yun. The museum also houses works by Zhao Hongmei and Zhang Yongshou. The museum is divided into four sections

- Exhibition on the history of paper cutting in China
- Main studio on paper cutting
- Training center on the art of paper cutting
- Sales center
