= Song Art Museum =

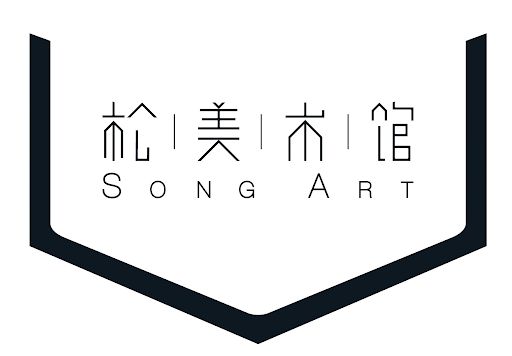
- Established: September 27, 2017; 8 years ago
- Location: Beijing, China
- Coordinates: 40.024537°N 116.579462°E
- Type: Art museum
- Founder: Zhongjun Wang

The Song Art Museum (Chinese: 松·美术馆) is a private museum in Beijing, China.

== History ==
The museum was opened in September 2017, the studio in charge of the design was Vermilion Zhou Design Group. The designer and creative director was Kuang Ming, those in charge of the architectural design of the building were Jing Huang and Hai Shi, the interior of the museum was designed by Jamie Pai and Garvin Hung. The museum was founded by Zhongjun Wang. The museum won the Golden A' Design Award for Architecture, Building and Structure Design in 2017. In 2021, Vermilion Zhou Design Group won the Architizer A+Firm Award 2021 for the design of the Song Art Museum in the "Best in Typology - Interior Design-Institutional/ Cultural" category. Since 2021, the museum has been part of the Google Arts & Culture platform.

== Collections ==
The museum contains modern Chinese works, oil paintings, photographs and sculptures. The museum contains 80 works of art from Wang's private collection. The museum contains exhibits with works by Tian Shixin, in 2018 a sculpture of Lao Tze was placed in the garden of the museum created by Shixin. In a 2018 exhibition, sculptures by Sui Jianguo, Zhang Wang, Liang Shuo, Xiang Jing, Liang Shuo, Geng Xue, Jiang Jie and Wang Wie were also on display at the museum. In June 201, the museum organized an exhibition called "Abstraction(s)", this exhibition contained works by Xu Qu, Kim Tschang-Yeul, Ha Chong-Hyun, Jean-Baptiste Bernadet, Günther Förg, John Armleder, Alex Israel, James Turrell and Anselm Reyle. In December 2019, the museum unveiled an exhibition called "Green" featuring artworks by Zhao Zhao dating from 2016 to 2019. In March 2021, the museum exhibited artwork by Hsiao Chin. In July 2021, the museum presented an exhibition by Chen Man and Song Yige called "Between", this exhibition is about the relationship between Chinese traditions and modern art.
