= Silhak Museum =

Coordinates: 37.516006°N 127.300622°E

- Established: June 23, 2009
- Location: Namyangju (South Korea)
- Type: History Museum
- Website: silhak.ggcf.kr

The Silhak Museum (Korean: 실학박물관) is a museum located in Namyangju, South Korea. The museum is devoted mainly to the study of the historical development of South Korea.

== History ==
Th construction of the museum began in 2004. The museum was inaugurated on June 23, 2009. The museum has been part of the Google Arts and Culture platform since 2016. In addition, in 2019, the museum expanded educational programs for the public.

== Collections ==
The museum contains information on the various economic reforms that took place in Korea, as well as artifacts of historical value such as compasses, old books and a 1708 world map made by the Joseon family. The museum also has exhibits on Korean geography and astronomy. In the astronomy part, the museum has screens where people can interact and see different constellations as well as artifacts such as ancient terraqueous globes. The museum contains exhibits on the development of Korean agriculture and industry.

== See also ==
- ko:실학박물관: Korean Wikipedia article on the Silhak Museum
