= Wajima-nuri =

Japanese lacquerware

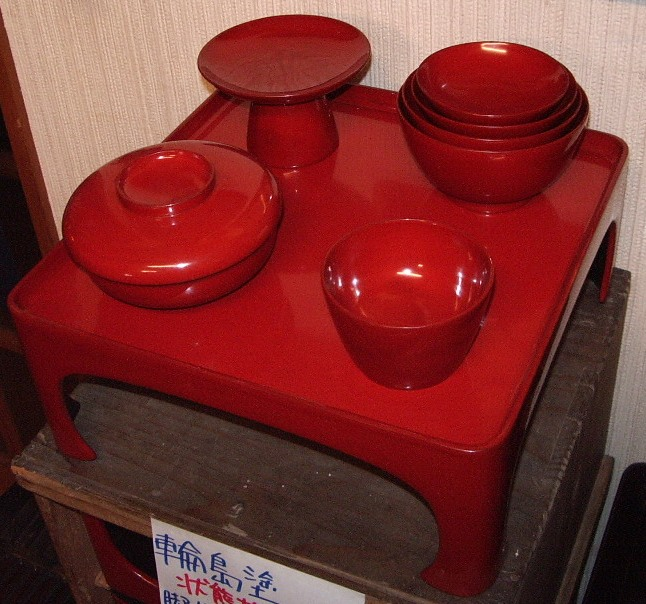
Wajima-nuri pieces

Wajima-nuri (輪島塗) is a type of Japanese lacquerware from Wajima, Ishikawa. Wajima-nuri represents a form and style of lacquerware which is distinct from other Japanese lacquerware. The main distinguishing feature of Wajima-nuri is the durable undercoating achieved by the applying multiple layers of urushi mixed with powdered diatomaceous earth (ji-no-ko) onto delicate zelkova wooden substrates.

== History ==
Lacquerware production in Wajima is thought to date back to ancient times. Lacquer products from 6,800 years ago have also been discovered at the Mibiki Ruins, also on the Noto Peninsula . In Wajima, lacquer products have been excavated at the Yadani B ruins, which are remains from the Heian period.

As a bowl with characteristics of Wajima lacquerware, a bowl using diatomaceous earth as a base was excavated at the Nishikawajima Gunmidate ruins ( early Muromachi period) in Anamizu-cho, south of Wajima across the mountains. The oldest surviving Wajima lacquerware is said to be the vermilion door of the former main hall of Juzo Shrine (Kawaimachi, Wajima City), which is said to have been made in 1524 during the Muromachi period .

It is said that the current Wajima-nuri technique was established during the Kanbun era in the early Edo period. Wajima, located at the northern tip of the Noto Peninsula, was a port of call for ships such as the Kitamae-bune, and by this time they had already expanded their sales channels by taking advantage of shipping. There was also peddling by land, and Wajima lacquerware, which has a good reputation for its robustness, was used all over Japan. Chinkin began in the Kyoho period in the middle of the Edo period, and maki-e in the Bunsei period in the late Edo period.

Exports declined due to the Sino-Japanese and Russo-Japanese Wars, but it was exhibited at every exposition overseas, and was traded at an outstanding price among lacquerware produced in major production areas.

Even today, Wajima lacquerware is widely sold as high-class lacquerware, and the Wajima Lacquer Art Museum in Wajima City in Ishikawa Prefecture has become a tourist spot. In addition, applications other than bowls are being explored, such as the production of Wajima lacquer violins. Furthermore, in response to the decline in domestic demand and demand for practical items, studios such as Unryuan, which produces and sells one-of-a-kind arts and crafts for wealthy people outside Japan, and Wajima-nuri lacquerware from overseas workshops such as Ross Studios, which make accessories, are also popping up, seeking to maintain the traditional industry in various ways.

== See also ==
- Ryukyuan lacquerware
