= The Clemente Museum =

Biographical museum in Pittsburgh, Pennsylvania

Clemente Museum
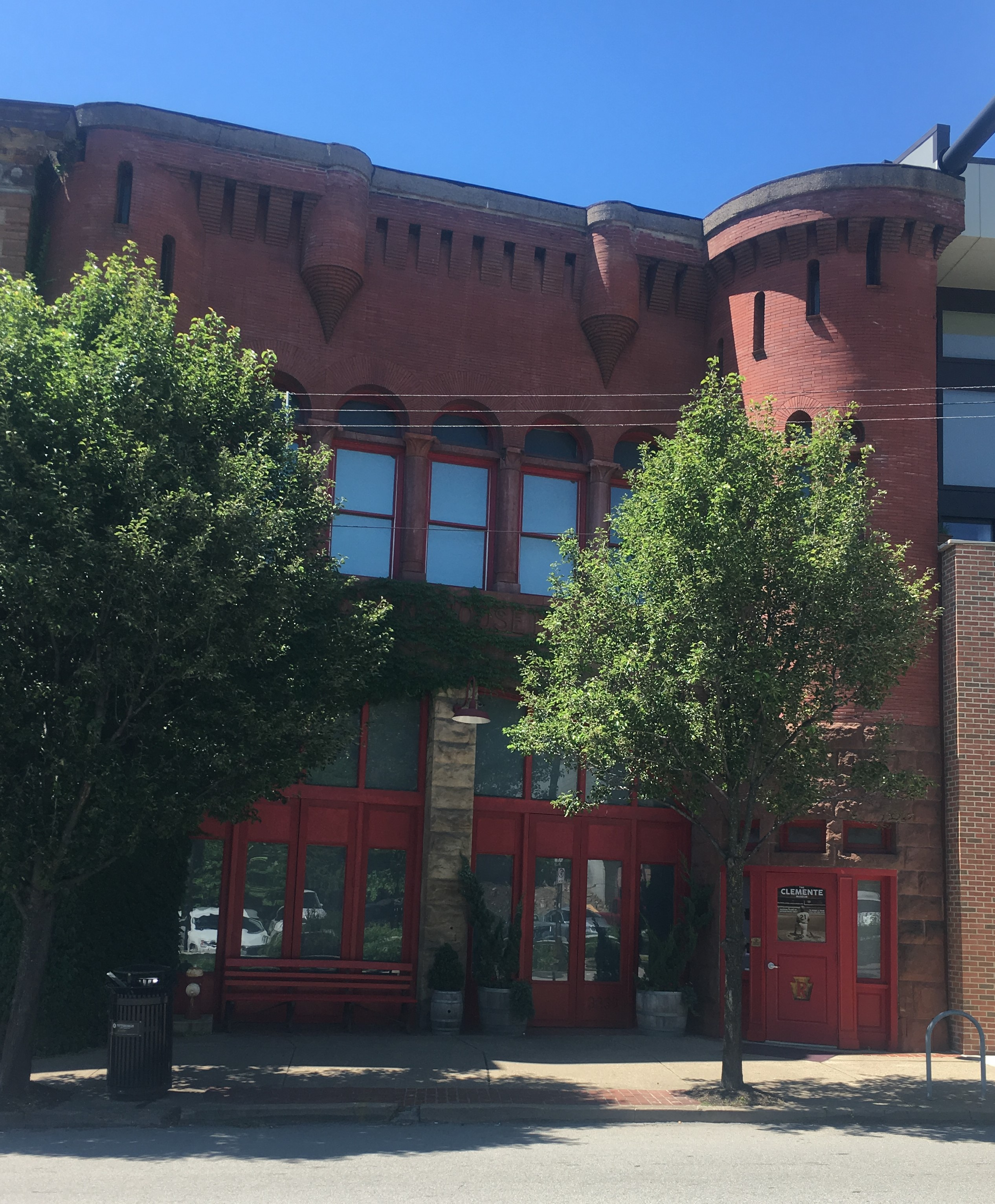

- Location in Pittsburgh
- Established: July 2007
- Location: 3339 Penn Ave; Pittsburgh, Pennsylvania 15201
- Coordinates: 40.4625°N 79.9677°W
- Executive director: Duane Rieder
- Parking: On site (no charge)
- Website: clementemuseum.com

The Clemente Museum is an American museum honoring Roberto Clemente, the Major League Baseball right fielder of the Pittsburgh Pirates and Hall of Famer.

The museum is located in the former Engine House No. 25, in the Lawrenceville section of Pittsburgh, Pennsylvania. It features thousands of items of Clemente memorabilia, including professional sports photography, Clemente family snapshots, old uniforms, gloves, balls, bats, and seats from Forbes Field.

== History ==
The Roberto Clemente Museum was founded in 2007 by photographer Duane Rieder. Rieder had met Clemente's family in 1994 during a photo shoot. A decade later, his personal Clemente collection with help from Clemente's immediate family would serve as the basis for the museum.

In 2017, a charity auction featuring over 700 pieces of Roberto Clemente's memorabilia was held. The roster included his 1960 and 1971 World Series ring.

== Charitable causes ==
The Clemente Museum carries on the giving legacy of Roberto Clemente. The museum organized local relief efforts upon hearing of the devastation of Hurricane Maria in Puerto Rico in 2017. They asked the community to donate $21, in honor of Clemente's number, for relief. The efforts raised over $50,000 and filled two 43-foot tractor-trailers with supplies.
