= Thai Flag Museum =

Museum in Bangkok, Thailand

Coordinates: 13.8005°N 100.5863°E

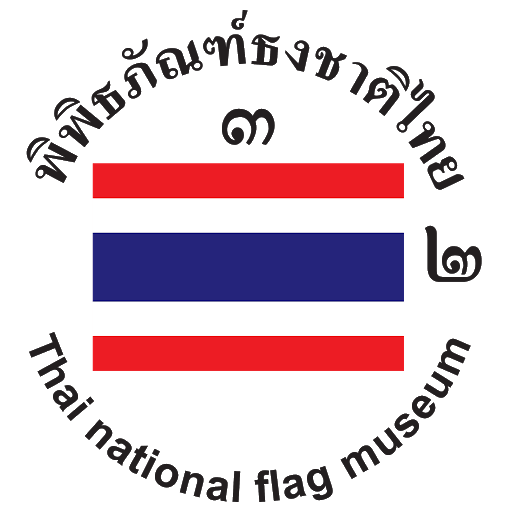
- Established: 2006
- Location: Bangkok, Thailand
- Founder: Pluethipol Prachumphol
- Public transit access: Phawana MRT station

The Thai Flag Museum (Thai: พิพิธภัณฑ์ธงชาติไทย) is a private museum located in Bangkok, Thailand. This museum is dedicated to the vexillology and history of the Thai flag. The museum promotes activities where people can learn more about the history and meaning of the country's symbols.

== History ==
The museum was founded in 2006, with the intention of preserving and further studying the history of flags. In 2010, for one of the exhibitions, the founder of the museum created the smallest flag of Thailand.

The museum is part of the Google Arts and Culture platform since 2019, in which part of its exhibits were digitized as well as a virtual tour was added with an adapted version of Google Street View.

== Collections ==
The museum contains collections of stamps, cigarette letters, hats, pins, books, postcards and documents on different historical flags of Thailand. Among them is a copy of the 1891 Siamese National Flag Standard Law. This museum is the only one in Thailand that is dedicated to the study of the history of the country's flag. The museum also offers additional information on the structure of the flag, such as the specific ratios that a particular flag should have and a collection of commemorative coins and medals.
