= Casa del Alabado Museum of Pre-Columbian Art =

Museum in Quito, Ecuador

Casa del Alabado Pre-Columbian Art Museum
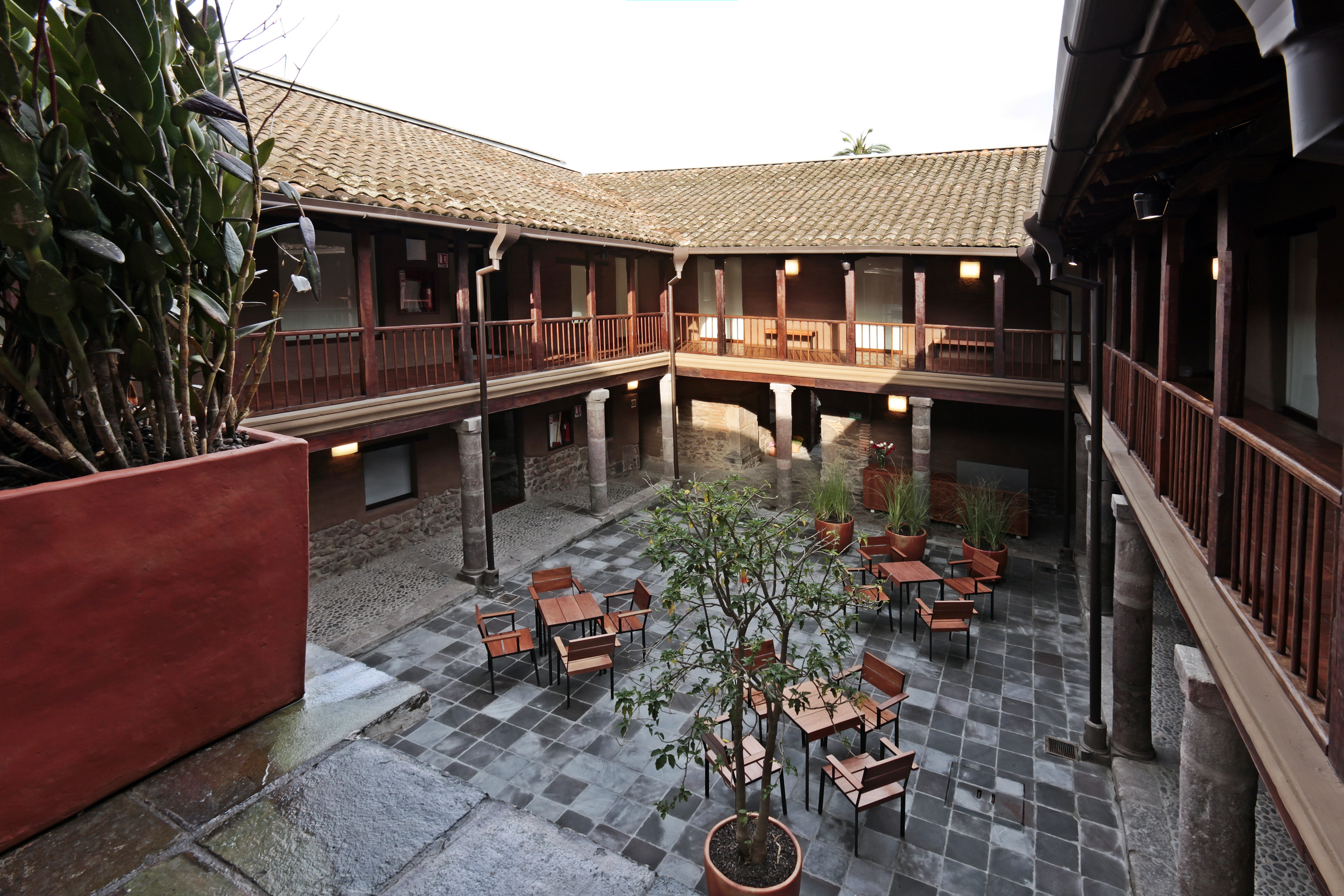
- Established: April 11, 2010
- Location: Cuenca N1-41 and Bolívar, Quito, Ecuador
- Coordinates: 0.221258°S 78.515822°W
- Collections: precolumbian art objects
- Website: alabado.org

UNESCO World Heritage Site
- Type: Cultural
- Criteria: ii, iv
- Designated: 1978
- Part of: City of Quito
- Reference no.: 2
- Region: Latin America and the Caribbean

Casa del Alabado is a Pre-Columbian art museum in Quito, Ecuador. The museum is located in a colonial house built in the 17th century during the Spanish Colony. It houses a collection of over 5,000 archaeological pieces, 500 of which are on permanent display.

Casa del Alabado is unique in the sense that its display is organized thematically, not chronologically. The aim of the museum is to treat objects as works of art rather than archaeological remnants. The display is distributed along eight rooms with eight different themes, which serve as representations of cultural aspects of ancient Ecuadorian cultures: their cosmology, their relationship with their ancestors, their religious ideas and rituals, and their relationship with their environment.

Casa del Alabado has:

Eight exhibit rooms, one room for temporary exhibits, two rooms for workshops, a museum shop and two courtyards.
