= Museum of Contemporary Art of Buenos Aires =

- Museo de Arte Contemporáneo de Buenos Aires
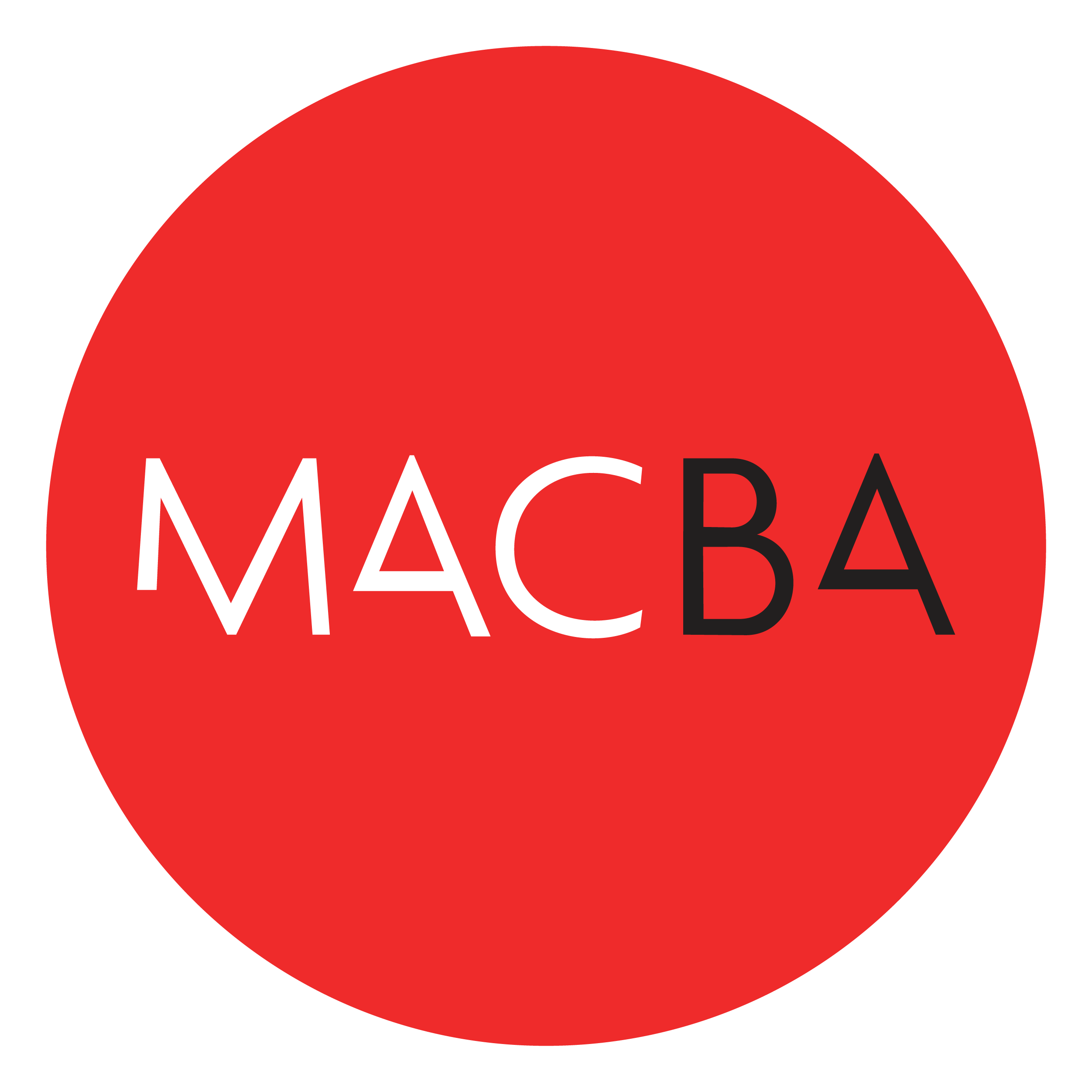

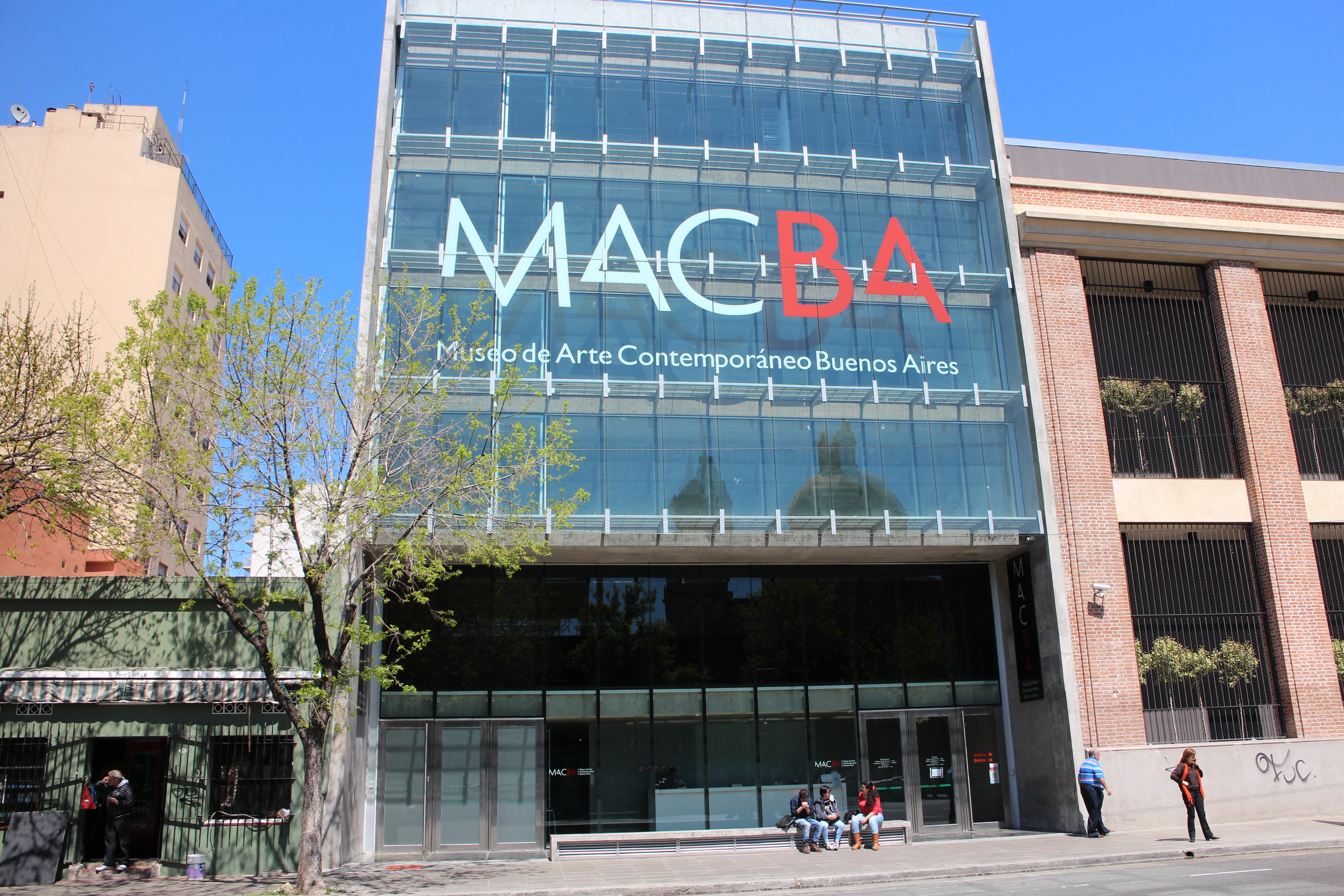
- Established: September 1, 2012; 12 years ago
- Location: San Telmo, Buenos Aires, Argentina
- Coordinates: 34.621971°S 58.370235°W
- Type: Art museum
- Website: museomacba.org

The Museum of Contemporary Art of Buenos Aires (Spanish: Museo de Arte Contemporáneo de Buenos Aires), also known for its acronym MACBA, is an art museum located in San Telmo, Buenos Aires, Argentina.

== History ==
In 2012, the museum was inaugurated by the Aldo Rubino Foundation, which has been collecting local and international contemporary art since the 1980s. The façade was designed by the architectural firm Vila Sebastián. During its opening in 2012, the museum featured 150 works of fine art, including Italian, American, Spanish and French artists. In 2013, it was reported that during 4 months the museum was visited by 15,000 people. Since 2020, the museum has been part of the Google Arts & Culture platform.

== Collections ==
The museum's collection has more than 500 works by artists such as Raúl Lozza, Julio Le Parc, Victor Vasarely, Enio Iommi and Gyula Kosice.

== Exhibitions ==
In 2016, 32 works by photographer Adriana Lestido were exhibited at the museum. Also in 2016, an exhibition on modern sculpture was presented at the museum. In 2017, the museum presented an exhibition featuring works of art by Eduardo Mac Entyre. In April 2018, the museum presented an exhibition on Latin American art that included works by Martha Boto, Estefanía Landesmann, Guillermo Kuitca and Enio Iommi. During November 2018, performative concerts were presented at the museum. In 2021, the museum organized an exhibition on geometric painting from Argentina containing works by Alfredo Londaibere, Graciela Hasper, Gumier Maier, Maria Martorell, Gilda Picabea, Pablo Siquier, Hilda Mans, Mariela Scafati, Fabián Burgos, Silvia Gurfein, Tulio de Sagastizabal and Magdalena Jitrik.
