= Liang Yi Museum =

Coordinates: 22°17′5.0″N 114°8′58.8″E

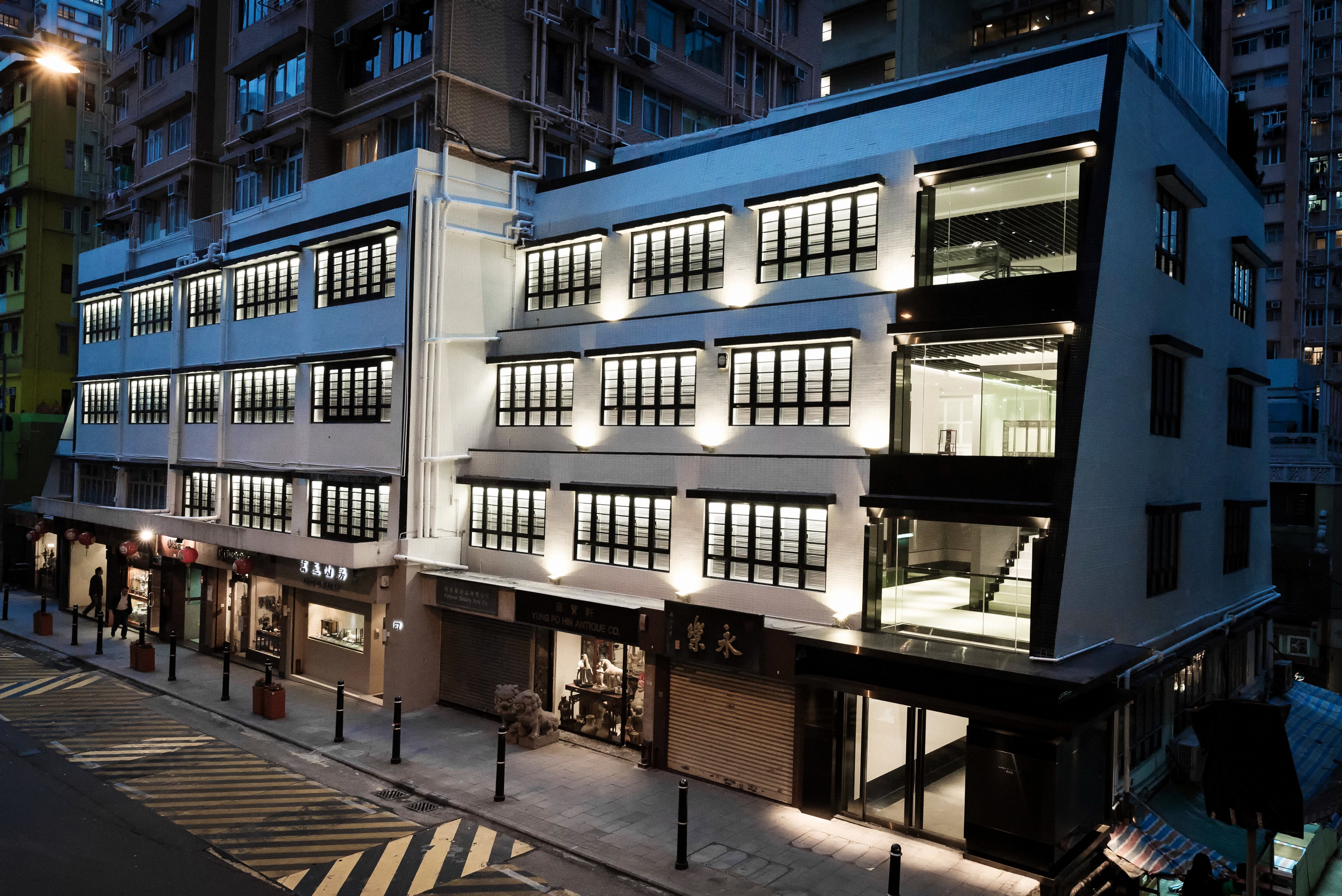
- Facade of Liang Yi Museum
- Established: 28 February 2014
- Location: 181 - 199 Hollywood Road, Sheung Wan, Hong Kong
- Type: Private Museum
- Collections: Chinese Furniture, Vanity, Japanese Works of Art and Western Historical Silver
- Founder: Peter Fung
- Director: Lynn Fung
- Website: http://www.liangyimuseum.com

Liang Yi Museum (Chinese: 兩依藏博物館) is a private museum of design, craftsmanship, and heritage. It is located in Sheung Wan, Hong Kong Island, Hong Kong.

Started in the 1980s, three decades later, the collection has grown to over 400 pieces, Selected pieces have been exhibited in other museums, including the National Museum of History in Taiwan and the Palace Museum in Beijing. In addition to permanent galleries devoted to furniture, the museum presents a changing array of exhibitions, publications, education and public programmes.

== Collections ==
The museum is home to one of the world's largest collections of Chinese antique furniture, made of the treasured materials huanghuali and zitan, from the Ming and Qing dynasties.

The Liang Yi Museum also houses the world's premier collection of bejewelled clutches, compacts, and powder boxes. Made in design houses such as Cartier, Boucheron and Van Cleef & Arpels, these nécessaires and minaudières were once a staple of every lady's evening wear. The collection has over 800 examples from the late 1880s through to the 1960s and has been lent out to other museums in the past, including the Palace Museum in Beijing and Goldsmiths Hall in London.

In addition to classical Chinese furniture and European vanities, the diverse collections of the museum also include European silver and Japanese decorative works of art.

== Exhibitions ==
Exhibition date	Exhibition Title	Information
17 September 2019 to 2 May 2020	Crowning Glory: The Beauty of Ladies’ Ornaments from Asia and Europe	Crowning Glory: The Beauty of Ladies' Ornaments from Asia and Europe was a landmark exhibition exploring the role of women’s clothing and accessories in the social construction of gender and identity from the late imperial era in China and Japan to the early modern period. The selection featured over 250 exhibits, including objects of everyday use from traditional Chinese furniture associated with the boudoir; Japanese hair ornaments and silver pieces; to textiles from both cultures; providing an insightful view into the traditional and modern concept of female beauty in the East, and its dilution and evolution upon the introduction of Western notions, morals and ideas.
18 March 2019 to 31 August 2019	Chrysanthemum and Dragon: The Art of Ornamentation in Japan and China in the 17th – 19th Century	Chrysanthemum and Dragon: The Art of Ornamentation in Japan and China in the 17th – 19th Century opened on 18 March 2019 and ran until 31 August 2019. The exhibition offered an insight into the differing yet equally lavish arts and crafts movements in China and Japan during the 17th to 19th centuries. Featuring over 180 Japanese objects – including the portable stationery, yatate; and the kiseru tobacco pipe, in addition to over 50 objects from the museum's classical Ming and Qing dynasties furniture collection, Chrysanthemum and Dragon was one of the largest exhibitions to explore the shared decorative traditions of China and Japan, allowing visitors to compare the craftsmanship of both cultures side-by-side. The exhibition was supported by The Consulate-General of Japan in Hong Kong.
4 September 2018 to 26 February 2019	Ink and Wood: Modern Chinese Paintings in the Scholar’s Studio	The exhibition Ink and Wood presented a collection of modern Chinese paintings alongside scholarly objects from Liang Yi Museum's permanent collection of classical Chinese furniture. Exhibitions previously organised at Liang Yi Museum had focussed on the decorative arts-classical Chinese furniture, European vanity cases and silverware of important historical significance, to name a few. However, for this exhibition, the Museum decided to bring together the two disciplines, by exhibiting 24 paintings by renowned modern Chinese painters (generously on loan from a local private collector) in recreated classic Chinese scholar's studios. The exhibition fused together the best of not only fine art and decorative art; but also juxtaposed traditional and classic craftsmanship versus the more contemporary medium of modern Chinese painting. This inter-disciplinary exhibition Ink and Wood: Modern Chinese Paintings in the Scholar's Studio not only showcased classical Chinese furniture alongside modern Chinese paintings; it also provided viewers a chance to explore the different aspects of a scholar's daily life as a whole; and gave a dual perspective on two of the most enduring Chinese artistic traditions: furniture-making; and ink painting.
11 July 2018 to 28 August 2018	Wenfang: A Treasure Trove of Ming and Qing Scholarly Objects	In the largest exhibition ever devoted to the field of scholarly objects, Wenfang: A Treasure Trove of Ming and Qing Scholarly Objects featured over 200 scholarly objects from the scholar's studio and classical Chinese furniture from the Ming and Qing dynasties, some never displayed in public before. These scholarly objects – both functional and inspirational, reflect the traditions and values of the literati. Curated in six main sections, the exhibition featured scholarly objects from brush pots and scroll pots to incense tools and game accessories. Ming and Qing scholars were the tastemakers of their time and their studios a reflection of their refined aesthetics; and the primary aim of the exhibition explored the different aspects of a scholar's daily life as a whole and to enable visitors, researchers and historians to visualise the lives these scholars would have led in their natural habitat, their studios or wenfang.
20 March 2018 to 24 June 2018	The Blue Road: Mastercrafts from Persia	Curated by Dr. Yuka Kadoi, The Blue Road: Mastercrafts from Persia was not only the first, but also the most dedicated and comprehensive exhibition surveying different aspects of the colour blue in Persian art and history, ever to be held in Hong Kong. Collaborating with eleven major institutions worldwide including the Victoria & Albert Museum in the United Kingdom; the David Collection in Denmark; the Asian Civilisations Museum in Singapore; and the Freer and Sackler Gallery Archives in the United States of America, the exhibition drew from an unparalleled scale of collaboration between a Hong Kong private museum and public international institutions with a united purpose in showcasing Persian decorative art to Asian audiences. Complementing these were also objects generously loaned from private collectors in Hong Kong. With materials and categories ranging from glass, ceramic, textile, painting and manuscript, this showcase of 94 carefully selected artefacts illuminated the significant role of blue in the visual and material culture of Iran. The colour personifies a timeless quality in Persian history and the impact made on the shaping of other artistic traditions in Asia and beyond. To complement The Blue Road: Mastercrafts from Persia, a gallery was dedicated to the blue vanities from the museum's permanent collection, made of materials in the blue colour spectrum, ranging from lapis lazuli to sapphires, enamel to turquoise. Vanity cases are bejewelled cosmetic boxes made for women in Europe starting at the end of the 19th century, and continuing all the way to the mid-20th century. The Blue Road featured just over 80 of these precious boxes.
21 March 2017 to 3 March 2018	Reunions: A Collector’s Journey	Inspired by the three movements of Beethoven's Les Adieux, or Piano Sonata No. 26, Das Lebewohl (The Farewell), Abwesenheit (The Absence) and Das Wiedersehen (The Return), Reunions: A Collector's Journey explored the relevance of the themes of loss, absence and return to building a collection. Featuring over 100 pieces of Chinese furniture from the Ming (1368–1644) and Qing (1644–1912) dynasties, Reunions told the story of how Liang Yi Museum's first collection was built and how Peter Fung, the museum's founder, spent decades reuniting antiques—ones that had originally come in sets—with their long-lost counterparts. Threatened by centuries of strife, foreign interference, and China's destruction of its own heritage during the Cultural Revolution, fewer than 10,000 pieces of classical Chinese hardwood furniture are thought to still exist. The furniture that does survive is scattered around the world, making collecting complete sets a daunting challenge. The highlight works in this exhibition provided an insight into the tastes and habits of the collectors and dealers who handled them, while simultaneously shedding light on episodes from China's tumultuous history.
1 September 2016 to 4 March 2017	The Secret Garden: Symbols of Nature in Wood, Silver and Gold	The beauty of the natural world and the passing of the seasons have been celebrated by painters and artisans since antiquity. In China, craftsmen embraced nature by turning magnificent tree trunks into elegant furniture and sculptures decorated with emblems of plants and animals, rich with historical and mythological associations. In Europe, nature symbolism from oral narratives, mythology and poetry found its way onto decorative objects in every century, evolving according to fashion. The Secret Garden: Symbols of Nature in Wood, Silver and Gold examined how the natural world is held in high respect by all people and the various ways that it is depicted in art throughout the course of three centuries. Over 200 pieces from the Liang Yi Museum's renowned collections of Chinese antique furniture from the Ming (1368-1644) and Qing (1644-1912) dynasties, as well as European, American, and Japanese silver and gold vanity cases, were displayed together for the first time to examine how artists, craftsmen, and designers from various continents and cultures created images of aesthetic beauty in response to nature. It looked at the elaborate symbolic language they utilized on objects made of wood, silver, and gold that was meant to be understood by everyone.
21 March 2016 to 18 August 2016	Masterpieces of British Silver: Highlights from The Victoria and Albert Museum	The beauty and brilliance of silver have made it an object of admiration throughout history. This exhibition traced the history and evolution of silver made in Britain through 46 works from the collection of the Victoria and Albert Museum. Boldly combining ancient practices and skills with the latest technological developments, these pieces reflected trends in fashion and design across continents. Spectacular examples of historical silver dating from the sixteenth to the early 19th century from the renowned Rosalinde and Arthur Gilbert Collection were displayed alongside dramatic sculptural pieces from noted contemporary silversmiths such as Gerald Benney and Michael Lloyd, along with original sketches. Ranging from the entirely abstract to the startlingly representative, these pieces demonstrate the diverse influences from which silverwork in Britain draws inspiration. Alongside Masterpieces of British Silver, selected pieces from the Liang Yi Collection of vanities provided a personal perspective to complement the silver exhibits, displaying techniques that parallel those used on silver, but on a smaller scale.
1 September 2015 to 6 March 2016	Scholars and Debutantes: A Contrast of Ascetic and Opulent Luxuries	Scholars and Debutantes was a two-part exhibition that explored the unique history of "play things" owned by scholars and sophisticates of the past. Two floors of the museum focus on different aspects of luxury. The male-dominated and ascetic world of the Chinese scholar's studio was explored through 100 literati objects from collections around the world. Contemporary ink paintings on loan from The Ink Society, Hong Kong illustrate the influence of these objects on artists today. On the upper floor, the opulent world of the early 20th-century woman was examined through a glittering display of European vanities from the houses of Cartier, Van Cleef & Arpels and Boucheron, among others. Together, these contrasting pursuits led to new insights into how luxury was interpreted differently over time and across cultures, and raised interesting questions about luxury in the 21st century.
3 February 2015 to 17 August 2015	Great Minds Think Alike: 18th century French and Chinese Furniture Design	Great Minds Think Alike showcased for the very first time a juxtaposition between French and Chinese furniture from 17th and 18th century, from the palaces of Louis XIV, XV and XVI, and the courts of the emperors Kangxi and Qianlong, and displaying many of the design and craftsmanship similarities between them. How should these resemblances be interpreted? Is there such a thing as a universal aesthetic mindset? In this exhibit, visitors experienced a panoramic view through parallels display of furniture from two of the world's most fabled courts.
1 September 2014 to 17 January 2015	Extinct Pleasures: The Use of Endangered Materials in Vanities	Extinct Pleasures showcased the use of now-extinct precious materials which were historically used in vanity cases, necessaires and compact cases. This exhibit explored why materials such as the hawksbill turtle, ivory or coral were commonly used; but also raised awareness to the importance of environmental conservation. The fact that these once commonplace materials are now endangered and protected should serve as a reminder of the finite number of resources we all share on this planet.
1 September 2014 to 17 January 2015	Tables and Chairs: A Study of Design and Craftsmanship	There are over 300 pieces of antique Chinese hardwood furniture from the Ming and Qing dynasties in the Liang Yi permanent collection. What is a rose chair? Or a southern official hat chair? How about a half table? In Tables and Chairs, the veil of carpentry jargon is lifted to reveal the building blocks of Chinese antique furniture. From basic terminology to more sophisticated comparisons of geographical style, this exhibit aimed to educate and enlighten through a representative sample of classic forms.
1 March 2014 to 15 August 2014	Ming and Qing Masterpieces: Icons of Antique Chinese Furniture	Ming and Qing Masterpieces: Icons of Antique Chinese Furniture is an impressive overview of the bygone arts of Chinese furniture making. The exhibition traced the development of Chinese furniture craftsmanship and style through over 300 objects, from delicately inlaid chests to immense twelve panel screens. Visitors discovered how the clean lines and unadorned grain-work of the Ming dynasty (1368-1644) evolved into the European-influenced, ornately carved forms of the Qing dynasty (1644-1912), as China began to open its doors to the West. Arranged by time period and material, the lower floor of the exhibition focused on Ming and early Qing huanghuali, while the upper floor featured pieces made of zitan, a dark, almost purple rosewood that became popular during the Qing dynasty.
1 March 2014 to 15 August 2014	Shanghainese Deco: Vanities in the Roaring Twenties	Shanghai in the 1920s was a cosmopolitan melting pot of East and West. As the gateway to China, travellers from across the globe visited the city and often brought back carved jades, lacquered boxes and traditional Chinese calligraphy as souvenirs. These objects inspired designers in Europe and America, who began to combine Chinese techniques and symbolism with the modern geometric designs of Art Deco. Curated by fashion historian Meredith Etherington-Smith, Shanghainese Deco: Vanities in the Roaring Twenties contained over 40 pieces from top jewellers Cartier, Lacloche, and Van Cleef & Arpels, including an elaborate black lacquer compact set with carved jade panels and diamond-cut Chinese calligraphy. Each piece portrayed orientalism at its height, reflecting the synthesis of cultures and modernity that characterised Shanghai before the outbreak of the Second World War in the 1930s.
